The 1915 Birthday Honours were appointments by King George V to various orders and honours to reward and highlight good works by citizens of the British Empire. The appointments were made to celebrate the official birthday of The King, and were published in The London Gazette and in The Times on 3 June 1915.

Many of the honours were awarded for efforts in the war. The Times noted, "The lists of Honours conferred on the occasion of the King's Birthday reflect the mood of the time, and contain, for the most part, the names of those who have been engaged in forwarding the national cause, in one way or another." A second list of birthday honours  "for services rendered in connection with military operations in the field" was released on 23 June, with appointments to date from 3 June. The list included nine recipients of the Victoria Cross, the highest and most prestigious award for gallantry in the face of the enemy that can be awarded to British and Commonwealth forces. Four of the recipients of the Victoria Cross were killed in actions and received the honour posthumously.

The recipients of honours are displayed here as they were styled before their new honour, and arranged by honour, with classes (Knight, Knight Grand Cross, etc.) and then divisions (Military, Civil, etc.) as appropriate.

United Kingdom and British Empire

Baron
The Rt. Hon. Sir Francis Bertie , British Ambassador in Paris since 1905.
Sir Kenneth Muir-Mackenzie , Permanent Principal Secretary to the Lord Chancellor since 1890 and Clerk of the Crown in Chancery.

Privy Councillor
The King appointed the following to His Majesty's Most Honourable Privy Council:
Lord Robert Cecil 
Sir John Newell Jordan 
Francis Dyke Acland 
Harold Trevor Baker 
George Cave 
Henry Edward Duke 
John Mackinnon Robertson

Baronetcies
Frank Bowden of Nottingham; chairman of the Raleigh Cycle Company.
Arthur Henry Crosfield .  Served as Member of Parliament for Warrington from 1900 to 1910.
Edward Alfred Goulding .  Elected Member of Parliament for Worcester in 1908. 
Robert Park Lyle, For public services as a member of the Royal Commission on Sugar Supplies.
Sir Henry Norman . Liberal Member of Parliament for South Wolverhampton and for Blackburn from 1910 to the present time.
Sir Gilbert Parker . Novelist and Honorary Colonel of the Kent Royal Garrison Artillery. Conservative Member of Parliament for Gravesend.

Knight Bachelor
Henry Francis Doran, member of the Congested Districts Board for Ireland. 
Honorary Commander Edward Lionel Fletcher . Joint manager of the White Star Line; contributed valuable services to the transport of the Expeditionary Force. 
Lieutenant-Colonel William Forbes, Commandant, Engineer and Railway Staff Corps, General Manager of the London, Brighton and South Coast Railway.
Charles Edward Fryer , Superintending Inspector of Fisheries, Board of Agriculture. Officer of the Legion of Honour, and an Officer of the Order of Leopold and of the Order of Dannebrog.
Joseph A. Glynn, Chairman, National Health Insurance Commission (Ireland). 
Henry Ledgard, of Cawnpore.
John Lindsay. Formerly Clerk to the Glasgow Corporation (Police Department), afterwards Senior Town Clerk Deputy, and subsequently Town Clerk.
Charles Stewart Loch. Former Secretary of the Charity Organization Society;  member of the Royal Commission on the Aged Poor, and subsequently served on the Royal Commission on the Care and Control of the Feeble-Minded and the Poor Law Commission.
James Mackenzie . Heart specialist and lecturer on cardiac research at the London Hospital, and author of many works on diseases of the heart.
John Henry Maden , High Sheriff of Lancashire.  From 1892 to 1908 he was a Liberal Member of Parliament for the Rossendale Division.
The Hon. Peter McBride, Agent-General in London for the State of Victoria. 
Leo George Chiozza Money .  Liberal member for Paddington North and East Northamptonshire; author and authority on economic and fiscal subjects.
Ruthven Grey Monteath, of Calcutta. 
James Murray .  One of the Trustees of the Scottish National Galleries. He served as a Liberal member of Parliament for East Aberdeenshire from 1906 to 1910, when he retired in 1910 because of ill-health.
Frederick Needham , Commissioner, Board of Control, Commissioner in Lunacy.
Walter P. Nevill,  London stockbroker whose advice on matters connected with the Stock Exchange since the outbreak of the war has been of great service to the Treasury.
Erik Olof Ohlson, of Hull, for valuable assistance to the Foreign Office since the outbreak of war.
William Pearce . He was a member of the London County Council from 1892 to 1900; Member of Parliament for the Limehouse Division of Tower Hamlets as a Liberal since 1906. Director of William Pearce and Sons, Ltd. and Spencer Chapman and Mensel (Limited), chemical manufacturers. 
Edward Rigg , Superintendent, Operative Department, Royal Mint. 
Edward George Saltmarsh,  Former president of the London Corn Trade Association and served on various War Committees.
William Napier Shaw , Director of the Meteorological Office.
William Capel Slaughter. Solicitor and founder of Slaughter and May; has served as a member of the Royal Commission on Sugar Supplies and has been helpful in other capacities to the Board of Trade.
William Slingo, Engineer-in-Chief, General Post Office.

Colonies, Protectorates, etc.
Herbert Brown Ames, Member of the House of Commons of Canada, Honorary Secretary of the Canadian Patriotic Fund. 
The Hon. Edgar Rennie Bowring, Member of the Legislative Council of Newfoundland. 
Henry Lumley Drayton , Chief Commissioner, Board of Railway Commissioners for Canada. 
John Craig Eaton, of Toronto. 
Charles Frederick Fraser , Superintendent of the School for the Blind, Halifax, Canada. 
Robert Hotung, of Hong Kong. 
The Hon. Thomas Hughes, Member of the Legislative Council of the State of New South Wales. 
Thomas Muir , Superintendent-General of Education, Province of the Cape of Good Hope, Union of South Africa-
Alexander Wood Renton, the Chief Justice of the Island of Ceylon.

British India
Rash Behari Ghosh , of Calcutta. 
John George Woodroffe, a Puisne Judge of the High Court of Judicature at Fort William, in Bengal. 
Rabindranath Tagore, of Bolpur, Bengal. 
Robert Richard Gales, Indian Public Works Department. 
Haji Muhammad Yusuf, of Bombay.

The Most Noble Order of the Garter

Knight of the Garter (KG)
Field Marshal The Rt. Hon. Sir Horatio Herbert, Earl Kitchener of Khartoum

The Most Honourable Order of the Bath

Knight Grand Cross of the Order of the Bath (GCB)
Military Division
Army
General Sir Douglas Haig , General, Colonel, 17th (Duke of Cambridge's Own) Lancers. 
General Sir Bruce Meade Hamilton , Commanding 1st Army, Central Force.

Civil Division
The Rt. Hon. Sir George William Buchanan , His Majesty's Ambassador, Petrograd.
The Rt. Hon. Sir Rufus Daniel, Baron Reading

Knight Commander of the Order of the Bath (KCB)
Military Division
Army
Lieutenant-General Edward Cecil Bethune  Colonel, 4th Dragoon Guards, Director-General of the Territorial Force, War Office.
Lieutenant-General William Pitcairn Campbell , General Officer Commanding-in-Chief, Southern Command.
Major-General William Henry Birkbeck , Director of Remounts, War Office.
Major-General George Kenneth Scott-Moncrieff , Director of Fortifications and Works, War Office.
Major-General Edward Ritchie Coryton Graham , Colonel, The Cheshire Regiment. 
Major-General Thomas Lethbridge Napier Morland  
Major-General Thomas D'Oyly Snow  
Major-General Francis John Davies  
Major-General Henry Hughes Wilson  
Major-General Henry Fuller Maitland Wilson  
Lieutenant-General Henry Buckley Burton Watkis , Indian Army.

Civil Division
George Stapylton Barnes , Second Secretary, The Board of Trade. 
Malcolm Graham Ramsay , Assistant Secretary, The Treasury.
The Rt. Hon. Sir John Fletcher, Baron Moulton

Companion of the Order of the Bath (CB)
Military Division
Royal Navy
Vice-Admiral Edward George Shortland (retired).
Engineer-Commander Harry Lashmore 

Army
Surgeon-General Thomas Martin Corker 
Major-General Charles Irwin Fry, Indian Army.
Major-General Walter Charles Hunter-Blair.
Colonel Coventry Williams.
Colonel Edward Douglas Brown-Synge-Hutchinson 
Colonel William Robert Stewart, Assistant Director of Fortifications and Works, War Office.
Colonel Reginald Salmond Curtis , Assistant Adjutant-General for Royal Engineers, War Office.
Colonel William George Hamilton 
Colonel Duncan Alwyn Macfarlane 
Colonel Alfred Horsford Bingley , Indian Army.
Colonel Richard Henry Ewart , Indian Army.
Colonel William George Lawrence Beynon , Indian Army.
Colonel Edward Mabbott Woodward.
Colonel Alexander Beamish Hamilton.
Colonel Walter Coote Hedley, General Staff, War Office.
Colonel the Hon. Alan Richard Montagu-Stuart-Wortley , Director of Movements, War Office.
Colonel Richard Wapshare, Indian Army. 
Colonel Frederick William George Wadeson, Indian Army. 
Colonel Claud William Jacob, Indian Army. 
Colonel Arthur Edward Aveling Holland 
Colonel Alfred Stokes  
Colonel Ricardo Dartnell Petrie.
Colonel Harry Neptune Sargent  
Lieutenant-Colonel and Brevet Colonel Edmund Howard Gorges , Commandant, West African Regiment. 
Colonel Owen Cadogan Wolley-Dod  
Colonel Alexander Stanhope Cobbe , Indian Army. 
Colonel Frederic James Heyworth  
Colonel Sherwood Dighton Browne. 
Colonel Arthur Lynden Lynden-Bell 
Colonel Sinclair Westcott , Army Medical Service. 
Colonel Robert St. Clair Lecky.
Colonel Robert James Geddes , Army Medical Service. 
Colonel Robert Wanless-O'Gowan.
Colonel Sidney Henry Powell.
Colonel Lochinvar Alexander Charles Gordon.
Colonel Arlington Augustus Chichester  
Colonel William Arthur Robinson.
Colonel Henry Joseph Everett.
Colonel Evan Eyare Carter 
Colonel Maurice Percy Cue Holt  
Colonel James Meek , Army Medical Service. 
Colonel Thomas Heron, Army Ordnance Department. 
Colonel Samuel Henry Winter. 
Colonel William Travers Swan , Army Medical Service. 
Brevet Colonel George Richard Tyrell Rundle, Royal Artillery. 
Colonel Howard Carr , Army Medical Service. 
Colonel Edward Feetham. 
Colonel Samuel Guise-Moores, Army Medical Service. 
Lieutenant-Colonel Laurence George Frank Gordon , Royal Artillery. 
Lieutenant-Colonel Vincent Alexander Ormsby, Indian Army. 
Lieutenant-Colonel James McCall Maxwell, Royal Artillery. 
Lieutenant-Colonel Richard Philipps Lee, Royal Engineers. 
Lieutenant-Colonel George de Symons Barrow, Indian Army. 
Lieutenant-Colonel John Henry Twiss, Royal Engineers. 
Lieutenant-Colonel Charles Stewart Prichard , The Northamptonshire Regiment. 
Lieutenant-Colonel Harold Arthur Lewis Tagart , 15th Hussars. 
Lieutenant-Colonel Robert William Hawthorn Ronaldson, The Highland Light Infantry. 
Lieutenant-Colonel Frederick Maurice Wilson, Army Service Corps. 
Lieutenant-Colonel George Templer Widdicombe, Indian Army. 
Lieutenant-Colonel Frederick Annesley Dudgeon, The Prince of Wales's Volunteers (South Lancashire Regiment). 
Lieutenant-Colonel Richard Fowler-Butler, The Royal Fusiliers (City of London Regiment). 
Lieutenant-Colonel Wilfred William Ogilvy Beveridge , Royal Army Medical Corps.
Lieutenant-Colonel William Price , Director of Army Postal Services, Royal Engineers, Special Reserve. 
Lieutenant-Colonel Percy de Sausmarez Burney, Royal Artillery. 
Lieutenant-Colonel Henry Allan Roughton May, The London Regiment (Artists' Rifles) (Territorial Force). 
Lieutenant-Colonel Sir Wilmot Parker Herringham , Army Medical Service (Territorial Force). 
Temp. Colonel Sir Almroth Edward Wright , Army Medical Service. 
Temp. Colonel Frédéric François Burghard , Army Medical Service (Territorial Force).

Australian Forces
Lieutenant-Colonel Neville Reginald Howse , Mediterranean Expeditionary Force (Staff).

Canadian Forces
Colonel Arthur William Currie, 2nd Canadian Infantry Brigade. 
Colonel Malcolm Smith Mercer, 3rd Canadian Infantry Brigade. 
Colonel Richard Ernest William Turner , 1st Canadian Infantry Brigade. 
Lieutenant-Colonel Henry Edward Burstall, Divisional Artillery, 1st Canadian Division. 
Lieutenant-Colonel Gilbert Lafayette Foster, Canadian Army Medical Corps.

New Zealand Forces
Colonel Edward Walter Clervaux Chaytor, New Zealand Staff Corps, Mediterranean Expeditionary Force (Staff).

Civil Division
Capt. William Reginald Hall 
Commander (Acting) John Alexander Duncan 
Eustace Henry Tennyson-d'Eyncourt, Director of Naval Construction, Admiralty.
Colonel John Arthur Edelsten , late Secretary of the West Lancashire Territorial Force Association and formerly Commanding 1st Volunteer Battalion, The Prince of Wales's Volunteers (South Lancashire Regiment).
Colonel Edward Hamilton Seymour, Deputy Director of Equipment and Ordnance Stores, War Office.
Colonel the Hon. Francis Richard Bingham, Assistant Director of Artillery, War Office.
Colonel Francis Torriano Fisher, Superintendent of the Royal Gunpowder and Small Arms Factories.
Colonel Harold Stephen Langhorne, Army Ordnance Department.
Edwin John Cheney, Chief Agricultural Adviser, The Board of Agriculture and Fisheries.
Edward Charles Cunningham, Secretary, The Board of Customs and Excise.
John Lamb, Assistant Under-Secretary, The Scottish Office.
Ernest Moon , Counsel to the Rt. Hon. Speaker of the House of Commons
Malcolm Cotter Caristou Setou, Judicial and Public Secretary, Correspondence Department, The India Office.
Guy Stephenson, Assistant Director of Public Prosecutions.
William Arthur Robinson, Assistant Secretary, The Office of Works.
Charles Walker, Principal Clerk, The Admiralty.
Herbert James Greedy , Private Secretary to the Secretary of State for War.

The Most Exalted Order of the Star of India

Knight Commander (KCSI)
Pazhamaneri Sundaram Sivaswami Iyer , an Ordinary Member of the Council of the Governor of Fort St. George, Madras.
Sir Frederick William Duke , Indian Civil Service (retired), a Member of the Council of India.
Edward Albert Gait  Indian Civil Service, an Ordinary Member of the Council of the Lieutenant-Governor of Bihar and Orissa.
His Highness Nawab Ahmad Ali Khan Sherwani Bahadur, Chief of Maler Kotla, Punjab.
His Highness Raja Amar Prakash Bahadur, Chief of Sirmur (Nahan), Punjab.
Lieutenant-Colonel Alexander Fleetwood Pinhey , Indian Army, Indian Political Department, Resident, Hyderabad.
William Henry Clark , an Ordinary Member of the Council of the Governor-General.
Sir William Stevenson Meyer , Indian Civil Service, an Ordinary Member of the Council of the Governor-General.

Companion (CSI)
Alan Butterworth, Indian Civil Service, Chief Secretary to the Government of Madras, and an Additional Member of the Council of the Governor for making Laws and Regulations.
Stephen Meredyth Edwardes , Indian Civil Service, Commissioner of Police, Bombay.
Nicholas Dodd Beatson-Bell  Indian Civil Service, an Ordinary Member of the Council of the Governor of Bengal.
Lieutenant-Colonel Francis Hardinge Eliott, Indian Army, Commissioner of the Irrawaddy Division, Burma.
Major-General Robert Charles Ochiltree Stuart, Royal Artillery, Director-General of Ordnance in India.
Herbert John Maynard, Indian Civil Service, Commissioner of the Lahore Division, Punjab, and an Additional Member of the Council of the Governor General for making Laws and Regulations.
Reginald Pemberton Russell, Secretary to the Government of India in the Public Works Department, and an Additional Member of the Council of the Governor-General for making Laws and Regulations.
James Bennett Brunyate , Indian Civil Service, Secretary to the Government of India in the Finance Department, and an Additional Member of the Council of the Governor-General for making Laws and Regulations.
Lieutenant-Colonel Armine Brereton Dew  Indian Army, Indian Political Department, Political Agent, Kalat, Baluchistan.
William Malcolm Hailey , Indian Civil Service, Chief Commissioner of Delhi.
Hugh Trowbridge Keeling , Chief Engineer and Secretary to the Chief Commissioner, Delhi, and a Member of the Delhi Imperial Committee.
Alfred Hamilton Grant , Indian Civil Service, Secretary to the Government of India, Foreign and Political Department.

The Most Distinguished Order of Saint Michael and Saint George

Knight Grand Cross of the Order of St Michael and St George (GCMG)
His Excellency the Rt. Hon. Sir James Rennell Rodd , His Majesty's Ambassador Extraordinary and Plenipotentiary to His Majesty the King of Italy.
General Sir Horace Lockwood Smith-Dorrien , Colonel, Nottinghamshire and Derbyshire Regiment
Lieutenant-General Sir James Willcocks , Commanding Indian Army Corps, British Expeditionary Force

Knight Commander of the Order of St Michael and St George (KCMG)
His Honour Lieutenant-Colonel John Strathearn Hendrie , Lieutenant-Governor of the Province of Ontario.
The Hon. Francis Henry Dillon Bell , Minister of Internal Affairs and of Immigration and Leader of the Legislative Council, Dominion of New Zealand.
Colonel the Hon. Charles Preston Crewe , Member of the House of Assembly of the Union of South Africa.
Henry Leclézio , Elected Member of the Council of Government of the Colony of Mauritius.
William Peterson , Principal and Vice-Chancellor of McGill University, Montreal.
Colonel George Leuchars , Member of the House of Assembly of the Union of South Africa. Minister of Commerce and industries, 1911-1912.
Charles Louis des Graz, His Majesty's Envoy Extraordinary and Minister Plenipotentiary to His Majesty the King of Serbia.
Francis William Stronge, His Majesty's Envoy Extraordinary and Minister Plenipotentiary to the Republic of Chile.
Lieutenant-General Sir John Grenfell Maxwell , Colonel, the Black Watch (Royal Highlanders), General Officer Commanding The Force in Egypt
Major-General Sir Cecil Frederick Nevil Macready , Adjutant-General, British Expeditionary Force
Major-General William Riddell Birdwood , Indian Army, Mediterranean Expeditionary Force

Companion of the Order of St Michael and St George (CMG)
Edward Gream Antrobus, Chief Accountant and Chief Clerk, Office of the Crown Agents for the Colonies.
Arthur William Garrard Bagshawe , Director of the Tropical Diseases Bureau.
Frederick Bowes, Principal Collector of Customs of the Island of Ceylon.
Frederick George Augustus Butler, of the Colonial Office.
Hector Livingstone Duff, Chief Secretary, Nyasaland Protectorate.
Dr. Daniel Miner Gordon , Principal and Vice-Chancellor of Queen's University, Kingston, Ontario.
Reginald Charles Hare, late Secretary, Office of the Agent-General for Western Australia.
William George Maxwell, British Adviser to the Kedah Government.
Brigadier-General Dudley Howard Ridout, Royal Engineers, in recognition of services during the recent disturbances at Singapore.
Commander Richard Markham Tyringham Stephens , Chief of Staff, Department of the Naval Service, Dominion of Canada.
James Leslie Williams, Under Secretary, Department of the Attorney-General and of Justice, State of New South Wales.
Major Frederick Carkeet Bryant , for services in connection with military operations in Togoland.
Malcolm Arnold Robertson, His Majesty's Chargé d'Affaires at Rio de Janeiro.
Martyn Cecil Gurney , His Majesty's Consul-General at Marseilles.
Harry Lionel Churchill, His Majesty's Consul-General at Havre.
Lieutenant-Colonel Oswald Arthur Gerald FitzGerald, Personal Military Secretary to the Secretary of State for War.
William Meyrick Hewlett, Acting British Consul at Shanghai.
Photius Philip Constantine Zaphiro, British Vice-Consul at Adis Ababa.*The Reverend John Morrow Simms  Principal Chaplain to the Forces. Army Chaplains' Department
Colonel Wellesley Lynedoch Henry Paget,
Colonel Francis John De Gex 
Colonel Charles Massy Mathew 
The Reverend Jacob Blackbourne , Chaplain to the Forces, 1st Class, Army Chaplains' Department
The Reverend William Stevenson Jaffray, Chaplain to the Forces, 1st Class, Army Chaplains' Department
The Reverend Ewen George Fitzroy Macpherson, Chaplain to the Forces, 1st Class, Army Chaplains' Department
Colonel Ernest Reuben Charles Butler , Army Veterinary Service
Colonel Colquhoun Grant Morrison
Colonel Henry Brooke Hagstromer Wright, Chief Engineer, Egypt
Colonel John Anderson Dealy
Colonel Herbert de Touffreville Phillips, Royal Artillery
Colonel Lancelot Graham, Royal Artillery
Honorary Colonel Henry Adeane Erskine , Northumberland Divisional Train
Colonel Francis Sudlow Garratt , Retired Pay
Brevet Colonel Courtenay Bourchier Vyvyan , Retired Pay, East Kent Regiment
Lieutenant-Colonel and Brevet Colonel Henry Joseph Walker Jerome , Retired Pay, Royal Engineers
Lieutenant-Colonel George Sidney Sheppard, Indian Army
Lieutenant-Colonel Algernon Edward Luke Wear , Royal Army Medical Corps
Lieutenant-Colonel Arthur William Bentley Buckle, Army Pay Department
Lieutenant-Colonel The Right Honourable Lord Richard Frederick Cavendish, 5th Battalion, Royal Lancaster Regiment
Lieutenant-Colonel Algernon Hamilton Stannus Goff, Royal Artillery
Lieutenant-Colonel Henry Wickham, Northamptonshire Yeomanry
Lieutenant-Colonel Frederic Gustav Lewis, 13th Princess Louise's Kensington Battalion, London Regiment
Lieutenant-Colonel Arthur Anthony Howell, 3rd Battalion, London Regiment, Royal Fusiliers
Lieutenant-Colonel Harry Walker, 4th City of Dundee Battalion, Royal Highlanders
Lieutenant-Colonel Colquhoun Scott Dodgson, Army Service Corps
Lieutenant-Colonel Herbert Graham Stainforth, Indian Army
Lieutenant-Colonel Rupert Shoolbred, 16th Battalion, London Regiment, Queen's Westminster Rifles
Lieutenant-Colonel Robert Sydney Hamilton, Army Ordnance Department
Lieutenant-Colonel Philip Geoffrey Twining , Royal Engineers
Lieutenant-Colonel Frederick George Langham, 5th Battalion, Royal Sussex Regiment
Lieutenant-Colonel Arthur Slade Baker, Army Ordnance Department
Lieutenant-Colonel Valentine Murray, Royal Engineers
Lieutenant-Colonel David Aubrey Callender, Royal Scots (Lothian Regiment)
Lieutenant-Colonel William Tankerville Monypenny Reeve, Leinster Regiment
Lieutenant-Colonel Tom Harry Finch Pearse, Cheshire Regiment
Lieutenant-Colonel Robert Hall Hayes, Middlesex Regiment
Lieutenant-Colonel Campbell Coffin, Royal Engineers
Lieutenant-Colonel Frederick Potts, Royal Artillery
Lieutenant-Colonel David Henry Drake-Brockman, Indian Army
Lieutenant-Colonel Joseph Oates Travers , Devonshire Regiment
Lieutenant-Colonel Reginald Burge Shipley, 9th Battalion, London Regiment, Queen Victoria's Rifles
Lieutenant-Colonel Thomas Owen Marden, Welsh Regiment
Lieutenant-Colonel Frederick Thornhill Ravenhill, Royal Artillery
Lieutenant-Colonel John Patrick Cumberlege Hennessy, Indian Army
Lieutenant-Colonel Henry Arthur Peyton Lindsay, Indian Army
Lieutenant-Colonel Thomas Walter Viscount Hampden, Hertfordshire Regiment
Lieutenant-Colonel David James Mason MacFarlane, 4th Ross Highland Battalion, Seaforth Highlanders
Lieutenant-Colonel Philip Richard Wood, Royal Irish Fusiliers
Lieutenant-Colonel Ralph Glyn Ouseley , Royal Artillery
Lieutenant-Colonel Alban Randell Crofton Atkins, Army Service Corps
Lieutenant-Colonel Charles Harford Bowie-Evans , Indian Medical Service
Lieutenant-Colonel Charles Crawford Murray, 9th Glasgow Highland Battalion, Highland Light Infantry
Lieutenant-Colonel Robert James Bridgford , Shropshire Light Infantry
Lieutenant-Colonel Charles Hesketh Grant Moore , Indian Army
Lieutenant-Colonel Nathaniel Melhuish Comins Stevens, Indian Army
Major and Brevet Lieutenant-Colonel John Campbell , Cameron Highlanders
Lieutenant-Colonel Hamilton Lyster Reed  Royal Artillery
Lieutenant-Colonel Arthur Dugdale, Oxfordshire Hussars Yeomanry
Lieutenant-Colonel Frank Wall, Indian Medical Service
Lieutenant-Colonel Gilbert Stewart Crawford , Royal Army Medical Corps
Lieutenant-Colonel Orlando George Gunning, Indian Army
Lieutenant-Colonel Walter Edmund Kerrich, Retired Pay, Royal Artillery (Indian Ordnance Department)
Lieutenant-Colonel Edward Treffry, Honourable Artillery Company
Lieutenant-Colonel Alfred Danvers Bayliffe, 12th Battalion, London Regiment, Rangers
Lieutenant-Colonel William Quintyne Winwood , 5th Dragoon Guards
Lieutenant-Colonel George Tom Molesworth Bridges , 4th Hussars
Lieutenant-Colonel Henry Worsley Worsley-Gough, 3rd Battalion, Monmouthshire Regiment
Lieutenant-Colonel Charles Edward Stewart, Royal Highlanders
Lieutenant-Colonel Wilfred Spedding Swabey, Army Service Corps
Lieutenant-Colonel Beresford Cecil Molyneux Carter, Liverpool Regiment
Lieutenant-Colonel Ernest Wright Alexander , Royal Artillery
Lieutenant-Colonel George Ross Marryat Church, Royal Artillery
Lieutenant-Colonel William Basil Emery, Royal Artillery
Lieutenant-Colonel Godfrey Bingham Hinton, Royal Artillery
Lieutenant-Colonel Henry Edward Theodore Kelly, Royal Artillery
Lieutenant-Colonel Graham Henry Whalley Nicholson, Royal Artillery
Temp. Lieutenant-Colonel (Rear-Admiral, retired) Gerald Charles Adolphe Marescaux, Deputy Assistant Quartermaster-General (Base)
Lieutenant-Colonel Charles William Compton, Somerset Light Infantry
Lieutenant-Colonel Thomas Ogilvie, 4th Battalion, Gordon Highlanders
Lieutenant-Colonel Jonathan Roberts Davidson, 10th Scottish Battalion, Liverpool Regiment
Lieutenant-Colonel Stuart Rodger Kirby, 6th Dragoon Guards
Lieutenant-Colonel David Ramsay Sladen , King's Own Scottish Borderers
Lieutenant-Colonel Percy Alexander Turner, West Riding Regiment
Lieutenant-Colonel Alister Fraser Gordon , Gordon Highlanders
Lieutenant-Colonel James Attenborough, 2nd Battalion, London Regiment, Royal Fusiliers
Lieutenant-Colonel Hugh Stanley Thurston, Royal Army Medical Corps
Lieutenant-Colonel Bernard Charles Green, 14th Battalion, London Regiment, London Scottish
Lieutenant-Colonel Stevenson Lyle Cummins , Royal Army Medical Corps
Lieutenant-Colonel Percy Evans , Royal Army Medical Corps
Lieutenant-Colonel Harold Ben Fawcus , Royal Army Medical Corps
Lieutenant-Colonel Thomas Herbert John Chapman Goodwin , Royal Army Medical Corps
Lieutenant-Colonel John Charles Baron Statham, Royal Army Medical Corps
Lieutenant-Colonel Arthur Lisle Ambrose-Webb, Royal Army Medical Corps
Lieutenant-Colonel William Percival Monkhouse , Royal Artillery
Major Reginald Salter Weston, Manchester Regiment
Major Percy Umfreville, Royal West Kent Regiment
Major James Hawkins-Whitshed Pollard, Royal Scots Fusiliers
Major Henry Ernest Walshe, South Staffordshire Regiment
Major Henry Thomas Caiitan, Duke of Cornwall's Light Infantry
Major Frederick Welsley Hunt, Army Veterinary Corps
Major Cranley Charlton Onslow, Bedfordshire Regiment
Major Hugh Norman Ramsay Cowie , Dorsetshire Regiment
Major Julian Mayne Young, Army Service Corps
Major Evan Gibb , Army Service Corps
Major James Fitzgerald Martin , Royal Army Medical Corps
Major John Bartholomew Wroughton, Royal Sussex Regiment
Major Sir Edward Scott Worthington , Royal Army Medical Corps
Major Henry Edward ap Rhys Pryce, Indian Army
Major Louis James Lipsett, Royal Irish Regiment (attached Canadian Forces
Major Henry Page Croft, Hertfordshire Regiment
Major George Alfred FitzGerald , Royal Artillery
Major Hew Francis Blair-Imrie, 5th Angus and Dundee Battalion, Royal Highlanders
Major Reginald Francis Arthur Hobbs , Royal Engineers
Major Cecil Howie Saunders, Army Ordnance Department
Major Erroll Mervyn de Smidt, Army Ordnance Department
Major Charles Glencairn Hill , Royal Berkshire Regiment
Major Lloyd Newton Jones-Bateman, Norfolk Regiment
Temp. Lieutenant-Colonel Gilbert Falkingham Clayton, Royal Artillery
Lieutenant-Colonel Robert Gilmour Edwards Leckie, 16th Canadian Battalion
Lieutenant-Colonel Frederick Samuel Lampson Ford, Canadian Army Medical Corps

Honorary Companion
Lieutenant-Colonel Jean-Eugène-Pierre Maroix of the French Army, for services in connection with military operations in Togoland.

The Most Eminent Order of the Indian Empire

Knight Grand Commander (GCIE)
Sir Charles Stuart Bayley , Indian Civil Service, Lieutenant-Governor of Bihar and Orissa.
Maharaja Sir Rameshwar Singh Bahadur  of Darbhanga, an Ordinary Member of the Council of the Lieutenant-Governor of Bihar and Orissa.

Knight Commander (KCIE)
Prabhashankar Pattani (Prabhashankar Dalpatram Pattani) , Temp. Member of the Council of the Governor of Bombay.
Maharaja Manindra Chandra Nandy of Kasimbazar, Zemindar, Murshidabad, Bengal, an Additional Member of the Council of the Governor-General for making Laws and Regulations.
Lieutenant-Colonel John Ramsay , Indian Political Department, Agent to the Governor-General and Chief Commissioner in Baluchistan.
William Maxwell , Indian Civil Service, Director-General of Posts and Telegraphs, and an Additional Member of the Council of the Governor-General for making Laws and Regulations.
Faridoonji Jamshedji , Assistant Minister, Political Department, to the Government of His Highness the Nizam of Hyderabad.
Mokshagundam Visvesvaraya , Dewan of Mysore.
His Highness Maharaja Bir Singh Deo Bahadur, Chief of Samthar, Bundelkhand, Central India.
John Stuart Donald , Indian Political Department, Resident in Waziristan, North-West Frontier Province.
Lieutenant-Colonel Percy Molesworth Sykes , Indian Political Department, Consul-General, Kashgar.

Companion (CIE)
Cecil Bernard Cotterell, Indian Civil Service, Private Secretary to His Excellency the Governor of Madras.
Alfred Wyndham Lushington, Imperial Forest Service, Conservator of Forests, Northern Circle, Madras.
Sardar Sahib Suleman Haji Kassim Mitha, Justice of the Peace, Bombay.
George Prideaux Millet, Indian Forest Service, Senior Conservator of Forests, Bombay Presidency.
Babu Ram Charan Mitra, Vakil of the High Court of Judicature at Fort William, Bengal, and Law Officer of Government.
Lieutenant-Colonel Walter Thomas Grice , Commandant, 1st Battalion, Calcutta Volunteer Rifles, and an Additional Member of the Council of the Governor of Bengal for making Laws and Regulations.
Lieutenant-Colonel Travers Dennys, Indian Army, Inspector-General of Police, Punjab.
Selwyn Howe Fremantle, Indian Civil Service, Collector and Magistrate of Allahabad, United Provinces.
Ziauddin Ahmad , Professor in the Mohammedan Anglo-Oriental College, Aligarh, United Provinces.
Abdul Karim Abdul Shakur Jamal, Rangoon, Burma.
Lieutenant-Colonel Cecil Charles Stewart Barry, Indian Medical Service, Medical Superintendent, General Hospital, Rangoon, Burma.
John Frederick Grunnig, Indian Civil Service, Magistrate and Collector, Shahabad, Bihar and Orissa.
Brigadier-General Benjamin Holloway, Indian Army, Secretary to the Government of India in the Army Department, and an Additional Member of the Council of the Governor-General for making Laws and Regulations.
Capt. Cyril Mosley Wagstaff, Royal Engineers, General Staff Officer, 2nd Grade, Army Headquarters.
Arthur Robert Anderson, Member, Railway Board.
Colonel Charles Henry Cowie, Royal Engineers, Agent, North-Western State Railway.
Kunwar Maharaj Singh  Barrister-at-Law, Provincial Service, Senior Assistant Secretary to the Government of India, Education Department.
David Petrie , Indian Police, Superintendent of Police, Punjab.
Godfrey Charles Denham, Indian Police, Superintendent of Police, Bengal.
Lieutenant-Colonel Joseph Windham, Indian Army, Indian Political Department, Resident, Western Rajputana States.
Herbert George Clark, Commercial Adviser to the Resident in the Persian Gulf.
Lieutenant-Colonel Charles Henry Dudley Ryder , Royal Engineers, Deputy Superintendent of Survey of India, and lately in charge Turco-Persian Frontier Commission, Survey Detachment.
Geoffrey Fitzhervey de Montmorency, Indian Civil Service, Personal Assistant to the Chief Commissioner, Delhi.
Raja Partab Singh, Chief of Ali Rajpur, Bhopawar, Central India.

Imperial Service Order (ISO)

Home Civil Service
George Henry Ashdown, Assistant Director of Stores, Admiralty.
Alexander Barnes, Accountant-General, Board of Trade.
Edgar Brine, Comptroller of Accounts and Stores, Prison Commission.
John Mitchell Brown, Clerk in Charge of Accounts, Civil Service Commission.
John William Colton, Clerk in Charge of Accounts, Local Government Board.
Charles Herman de Lemos, H.M. Consul at Ciudad Bolivar.
Daniel Forbes, Chief Clerk, General Board of Control for Scotland.
Frederick Hellard, Joint Secretary, Office of Woods, Forests and Land Revenues.
Joseph Hunt, Principal Clerk, Ordnance Factories.
Anthony Ormsby, Principal Clerk, Treasury Remembrancer's Office, Dublin Castle.
John Erwin Piper, Assistant Solicitor, Inland Revenue.
David Mitchell Stewart, Superintending Engineer, General Post Office.

Colonial Civil Service
Frederic Charles Bigger, Receiver of Revenue, Johannesburg.
Louis Albert Célestin, Superintendent of Inland Revenue and Distilleries, Colony of Mauritius.
Capt. Richard Burton Deane, lately Superintendent, Royal North-West Mounted Police Force, Dominion of Canada.
James Edward Aquart Ferguson , Government Medical Center, Colony of British Guiana.
Francis Hernaman Gisborne , Parliamentary Counsel, Law Branch, House of Commons of Canada.
James Mackenzie, Under Secretary for Crown Lands, Dominion of New Zealand.
Lionel William Stanton, Secretary to the Minister of Education and Secretary to the Education Department, State of South Australia.
James Wilkinson Whyte, Recorder of Titles, Land Titles Office, State of Tasmania.

Indian Civil Service
Charles Edward James Twisaday, Office of the Secretary of State for India.
Ernest Charles Winchester, Office of the Secretary of State for India.
Sir George Edward Knox , Indian Civil Service, a Puisne Judge of the High Court of Judicature, North-Western Provinces.
Raj Chuni Lal Basu Bahadur , 1st Assistant Chemical Examiner of Government, Teacher of Physics and Chemistry, Campbell Medical School, and Fellow of the Calcutta University.
Harrington George Bulkley, Assistant Collector of Salt Revenue, Thana, Bombay Presidency.
Raj Bahadur Lala Gauri Shankar, Provincial Service, Extra Assistant Commissioner in the Punjab.
Frank Dacombe Bird , Chief Presidency Magistrate, Madras.
Maung Paw Tun , Provincial Civil Service, Judge, Sub-Divisional Courts of Insein and Taikgyi, Burma.
Richard Joshua Keys, Indian Telegraph Department, Deputy Superintendent, Traffic, Shimla.
Bomanji Nowroji Khambatta, Head Clerk, Office of Assistant Director of Supplies and Transports, 6th (Poona) Division.
James Henry Taylor, Provincial Civil Service, Deputy Commissioner of Augul, Bihar and Orissa.
Khan Bahadur Muhammad Abdul Kurnn Khan, Provincial Service, Extra Assistant Commissioner, District Judge, Hazara, North-West Frontier Province.
Rafi Sahib Lala Bhag Mai, Personal Indian Assistant to the Agent to the Governor-General and Chief Commissioner in Baluchistan.

Victoria Cross (VC)

† Lieutenant-Colonel Charles Hotham Montagu Doughty-Wylie,  Headquarters Staff, Mediterranean Expeditionary Force; and
† Captain Garth Neville Walford, Brigade Major, Royal Artillery, Mediterranean Expeditionary Force. Citation — 
'"On 26th April, 1915, subsequent to a landing having been effected on the beach at a point on the Gallipoli Peninsula, during which both Brigadier-General and Brigade Major had been killed, Lieutenant-Colonel Doughty-Wylie and Captain Walford organized and led an, attack through and on both sides of the village of Sedd-el-Bahr on the Old Castle at the top of the hill inland. The enemy's position was very strongly held and entrenched, and defended with concealed machine-guns and pom-poms. It was mainly due to the initiative, skill and great gallantry of these two Officers that the attack was a complete success. Both were killed in the moment of victory."
Captain Francis Alexander Caron Scrimger, Canadian Army Medical Service, Medical Officer, 14th Battalion, Royal Montreal Regiment. Citation — 
"On the afternoon of 25th April, 1915, in the neighbourhood of Ypres, when in charge of an advanced dressing station in some farm buildings, which were being heavily shelled by the enemy, he directed under heavy fire the removal of the wounded, and he himself carried a severely wounded Officer out of a stable in search of a place of greater safety. When he was unable alone to carry this Officer further, he remained with him under fire till help could be obtained During the very heavy fighting between 52nd and 25th April, Captain Scrimger displayed continuously day and night the greatest devotion to his duty among the wounded at the front."
Lieutenant George Rowland Patrick Roupell, 1st Battalion, East Surrey Regiment.  Citation — 
"For most conspicuous gallantry and devotion to duty on April 20th, 1915, when he was commanding a company of his battalion in a front trench on "Hill 60," which was subjected to' a most severe bombardment throughout the day. Though wounded in several places, he remained at his post and led his company in repelling a strong German assault. During a lull in the bombardment he had his wounds hurriedly dressed, and then insisted in returning to his trench, which was again being subjected to severe bombardment. Towards evening, his company being dangerously weakened, he went back to his battalion headquarters, represented the situation to his Commanding Officer, and brought up reinforcements, passing backwards and forwards over ground swept by heavy fire. With these reinforcements he held his position throughout the night, and until his battalion was relieved next morning. This young Officer was one of the few survivors of his company, and showed a magnificent example of courage, devotion and tenacity, which undoubtedly inspired his men to hold out till the end."
† Colour-Sergeant Frederick William Hall, 8th Canadian Battalion. Citation — 
"On 24th April, 1915, in the neighbourhood of Ypres, when a wounded man who was lying some 15 yards from the trench called for help, Company Sergeant-Major Hall endeavoured to reach him in the face of a very heavy enfilade fire which was being poured in by the enemy. The first attempt-failed, and a Non-commissioned Officer and private soldier who were attempting to give assistance were both wounded. Company Sergeant-Major Hall then made a second most gallant attempt, and was in the act of lifting up the wounded man to bring him in when he fell mortally wounded in the head." 
Lance-Sergeant Douglas Walter Belcher, 1/5th (City of London) Battalion, London Regiment (London Rifle Brigade). Citation — 
"On the early morning of 13th May, 1915, when in charge of a portion of an advanced breastwork south of the Wieltje-St. Julien Road during a very fierce and continuous bombardment by the enemy, which frequently blew in the breastwork, Lance-Sergeant Belcher with a mere handful of men elected to remain and endeavour to hold his position after the troops near him had been withdrawn. By his skill and great gallantry he maintained his position during the day, opening rapid fire on the enemy, who were only 150 to 200 yards distant, whenever he saw them collecting for an attack. There is little doubt that the bold front shown by Lance-Sergeant Belcher prevented the enemy breaking through on the Wieltje Road, and averted an attack on the flank of one of our Divisions."
† Lance-Corporal Frederick Fisher, 13th Canadian Battalion. Citation — 
"On 23rd April, 1915, in the neighbourhood of St. Julien, he went forward with the machine gun, of which he was in charge, under heavy fire, and most gallantly assisted in covering the retreat of a battery, losing four men of his gun team. Later, after obtaining four more men, he went forward again to the firing line and was himself killed while bringing his machine gun into action under very heavy fire, in order to cover the advance of supports."
Private William Mariner, 2nd Battalion, King's Royal Rifle Corps. Citation — 
"During a violent thunderstorm on the night of 22nd May, 1915, he left his trench near Cambrin, and crept out through the German wire entanglements till he reached the emplacement of a German machine gun which had been damaging our parapets and hindering our working parties. After climbing on the top of the German parapet he threw a bomb in under the roof of the gun emplacement and heard some groaning and the enemy running away. After about a quarter of an hour he heard some of them coming back again, and climbed up on the other side of the emplacement and threw another bomb among them left-handed. He then lay still while the Germans opened a heavy fire on the wire entanglement behind him, and it was only after about an hour that he was able to crawl back to his own trench. Before starting out he had requested a serjeant to open fire on the enemy's trenches as soon as he had thrown his bombs. Rifleman Mariner was out alone for one and a half hours carrying out this gallant work."

Distinguished Service Order (DSO)
Citation —  The King has been graciously pleased to give orders for the following appointments to the Distinguished Service Order in respect of the undermentioned Officers, in recognition of their services with the Mediterranean Expeditionary Force:

Commander Victor Lindsay Arbuthnot Campbell , Commanding Drake Battalion, Royal Naval Division.
Lieutenant-Commander Bernard Cecil Freyberg, Royal Naval Volunteer Reserve, Hood Battalion, Royal Naval Division.

Citation — The King has been graciously pleased to approve of the following rewards for gallantry and devotion to duty in connection with the operations at the Dardanelles (Mediterranean Expeditionary Force):

Lieutenant-Colonel W. R. McNicoll, 6th Australian Infantry Battalion (Victoria).
Lieutenant-Colonel C. B. B. White, Royal Australian Garrison Artillery, Staff.
Major Arthur Thackeray Beckwith, 2nd Battalion, The Hampshire Regiment.
Major Charles Henry Brand, Brigade Major, 3rd Infantry Brigade (Australian Forces).
Major James Samuel Denton, 11th Australian Infantry Battalion (West Australia).
Major Herbert Ernest Hart, Wellington Battalion, 17th (Ruahine) Regiment, New Zealand Forces.
Major James Heane, 4th Australian Infantry Battalion (New South Wales).
Major William Owen Mansbridge, 16th Australian Infantry Battalion (South Australia, Western Australia).
Major Eugene Joseph O'Neill  New Zealand Medical Corps.
Major Robert Rankine, 14th Australian Infantry Battalion (Victoria).
Major Fred Waite, New Zealand Engineers Territorial Force.
Capt. Edward William Atkinson, 1st Battalion, The Royal Inniskilling Fusiliers.
Capt. Arthur Graham Butler, Australian Army Medical Corps (attached 9th Australian Infantry Battalion) (Queensland).
Capt. Arthur Cunliffe Bernard Critchley-Salmonson, The Royal Munster Fusiliers (Attached New Zealand Forces).
Capt. Guy Westland Geddes, 1st Battalion, The Royal Munster Fusiliers.
Capt. Richard Haworth, 1st Battalion, The Lancashire Fusiliers.
Capt. Cecil Ridings, 1st Battalion, The Royal Inniskilling Fusiliers.
Lieutenant Henry Desmond O'Hara, 1st Battalion, The Royal Dublin Fusiliers.

Additional Companions of the Distinguished Service Order
Major George Henry Addison, Royal Engineers
Major Henry Lethbridge Alexander, Dorsetshire Regiment
Major John Maurice Arthur, Territorial Force, 1st Lowland Field Company
Major Charles Ernest Atchison, King's Shropshire Light Infantry
Major Patterson Barton, Royal Regiment of Artillery
Major Arthur Sydney Bates, London Regiment, 5th City of London Battalion (London Rifle Brigade)
Captain John Douglas Mortimer Beckett, Hampshire Regiment
Major Alfred Bryan Bethell, Royal Regiment of Artillery
Major Paget Kemmis Betty, Royal Engineers
Major Humphrey Francis William Bircham, King's Royal Rifle Corps
Hon. Major Walter William Blades, Army Ordnance Department
Major William Alan Blake, Wiltshire Regiment
Major Lyster Fettiplace Blandy, Royal Engineers
Major Guy Hamilton Boileau, Royal Engineers
Major Oswald Cuthbert Borrett, King's Own (Royal Lancaster Regiment)
Major Hugh Edward Richard Boxer, Lincolnshire Regiment
Major John Eric Spencer Brind, Royal Artillery
Major Christopher Robert Ingham Brooke, King's Own Yorkshire Light Infantry
Brevet Major H. R. M. Brooke-Popham, Royal Flying Corps, Oxfordshire and Buckinghamshire Light Infantry
Major Alan Brough, Royal Engineers
Captain Cuthbert Garrard Browne, Royal Army Medical Corps
Captain Archibald Gordon Bruce, Royal Scots Fusiliers
Major Colin Napier Buchanan-Dunlop, Royal Regiment of Artillery
Major George Moultrie Bullen-Smith, Prince of Wales's Leinster Regiment (Royal Canadians)
Captain Herbert Cecil Buller, Rifle Brigade (Prince Consort's Own) (attached Princess Patricia's Canadian Light Infantry)
Captain Hubert Francis Burke, Royal Regiment of Artillery
Captain Henry Pelham Burn, Gordon Highlanders
Major Henry Mortimer Caddell, Army Service Corps
Major Charles Archibald Calvert, Surrey Yeomanry (Queen Mary's Regiment)
Captain Claude Henry Campbell, Manchester Regiment (attached London Regiment)
Captain Herbert St Maur Carter  Royal Army Medical Corps
Captain Thomas Walter Colby Carthew, Royal Flying Corps, Bedfordshire Regiment
Major James Graham Chaplin, Cameronians (Scottish Rifles)
Major John Charteris, Royal Engineers
Major Hubert Clementi Smith, Royal Engineers
Lieutenant-Colonel William Fletcher Clemson, York and Lancaster Regiment
Major George Sidney Clive, Grenadier Guards
Major Arthur Stedman Cotton, Royal Regiment of Artillery
Major Reginald Vionnee Cowey, Royal Army Medical Corps
Captain Edgar William Cox, Royal Engineers
Captain Thomas Joseph Crean , Royal Army Medical Corps
Captain Cleland Bulstrode Cumberlege, Bedfordshire Regiment
Major Dighton Hay Abercromby Dick, Royal Scots Fusiliers
Captain John Greer Dill, Leinster Regiment
Captain Henry Mountiford Dillon, Oxfordshire and Buckinghamshire Light Infantry
Captain Raymond Vernon Doherty-Holwell, Royal Engineers
Captain Winston Joseph Dugan, Worcestershire Regiment
Major Robert Gilmour Earle, Royal Engineers
Major Arthur Ellershaw, Royal Regiment of Artillery
Captain Nigel Harry Skinner Fargus, Royal Scots (Lothian Regiment)
Captain Edmund Bromfield Ferrers, Cameronians (Scottish Rifles)
Major Thomas Evelyn Fielding , Royal Army Medical Corps
Regimental Sergeant-Major W. Finney, Manchester Regiment
Major Alan Francis Fletcher, 17th Lancers
Major Henry Francis Fraser, 21st Lancers
Captain Robert Gale , Royal Army Medical Corps
Major Philip Woolcott Game, Royal Artillery
Captain Henry George Gandy, Royal Engineers
Major William Gemmill, Royal Scots (Lothian Regiment)
Major George Francis Bennett Goldney, Royal Engineers
Captain Lewis Gordon, Gordon Highlanders
Major Philip Gould, Royal Irish Fusiliers (Princess Victoria's)
Captain Edward Byng George Gregge-Hopwood, Coldstream Guards
Major David Maitland Griffith, Royal Engineers
Captain Ralph Gore Devereux Groves-Raines, Buffs (East Kent Regiment)
Captain Robert Hadden Haining, Royal Artillery
Major Gilbert Claud Hamilton, Grenadier Guards
Major John Harington, Rifle Brigade (Prince Consort's Own) 
Captain Arthur Ellis Fowke Harris, Princess Charlotte of Wales's (Royal Berkshire Regiment)
Major Robert Leycester Haymes, Royal Regiment of Artillery
Major Ross John Finnis Hayter, Cheshire Regiment (Attached 1st Canadian Division)
Major Austin Hubert Wightwick Haywood, Royal Regiment of Artillery
Captain Hugh Roger Headlam, York and Lancaster Regiment
Major Richard George Hely-Hutchinson, Royal Fusiliers (City of London Regiment)
Captain Reginald John Thornton Hildyard, Royal West Kent Regiment
Staff Major Hugh Hill , Royal Welsh Fusiliers
Captain Harry Sidney Hodgkin, 4th Royal Irish Dragoon Guards (attached Cheshire Regiment)
Captain Lancelot Holland, Seaforth Highlanders
Major John William Hope, Royal Regiment of Artillery
Captain Richard Granville Hylton Howard-Vyse, Royal Horse Guards
Major Herbert Gwynne Howell, Royal Regiment of Artillery
Major Robert Hutchison, 4th Dragoon Guards
Major Lionel Dalton Inglefield, Army Service Corps
Major William Edmund Ironside, Royal Artillery
Major Francis Stephen Irvine , Royal Army Medical 
Captain Aylmer Vivian Jarrett, York and Lancaster Regiment
Corps Major Raymond Henry Johnson, Royal Artillery
Captain Lumley Owen Williams Jones, Essex Regiment
Captain Algernon Roderick Kino, East Yorkshire Regiment
Major Gerald Richard Vivian Kinsman, Royal Regiment of Artillery
Captain Michael Laurence Lakin, 11th Prince Albert's Own Hussars
Major Francis Fane Lambarde, Reserve of Officers
Captain Bertram Henry Leatham, Alexandra Princess of Wales's Own (Yorkshire Regiment)
Major Eric Henry Goodwin Leggett, Royal Regiment of Artillery
Captain Clive Gerard Liddell, Leicestershire Regiment
Major Robert Clarence Wellesley Lukin, Indian Army
Major Reginald Kirkpatrick Lynch-Staunton, Royal Artillery
Captain Percy Arnold Lloyd-Jones  Royal Army Medical Corps
Major Hugh James Alexander MacKey  Royal Regiment of Artillery
Major Charles Forbes Shaw MacLaverty, Royal Regiment of Artillery
Major Harry Maclear, East Lancashire Regiment
Major Charles William Macleod, Army Service Corps
Captain Ernest Llewellyn Makin, Wiltshire Regiment (Duke of Edinburgh's)
Captain Conwyn Mansel-Jones , Reserve of Officers
Captain Oswald William McSheehy , Royal Army Medical Corps
Major Charles Reynolds Mortimore, Sherwood Foresters (Nottinghamshire and Derbyshire Regiment)
Major Edward Maurice Moulton-Barrett, Northumberland Fusiliers
Major John Leslie Mowbray, Royal Artillery
Major Vernon Monro Colquhoun Napier, Royal Regiment of Artillery
Major Edward Harding Newman, Royal Regiment of Artillery
Captain Oliver Henry North, Lancashire Fusiliers
Captain Charles Ogston, Gordon Highlanders
Captain Charles Samuel Owen, Royal Welsh Fusiliers
Major Frank Page, Hertfordshire Regiment
Major Alan Thomas Paley, Rifle Brigade
Surgeon-Major Basil Pares, Royal Horse Guards
Captain William Swynfen Whitehall Parker-Jervis, King's Royal Rifle Corps
Captain Geoffrey Francis Phillips, Duke of Cornwall's Light Infantry
Lieutenant-Colonel John Poe , Royal Army Medical Corps
Major Josselyn Vere Ramsden, Royal Regiment of Artillery
Major Anthony Julian Reddie, South Wales Borderers
Captain Lewis Frederick Renny, Royal Dublin Fusiliers
Temp. Captain Owen W. Richards , Royal Army Medical Corps
Major Edward Vansittart Dick Riddell, Royal Regiment of Artillery
Major Crofton Edward Pym Sankey, Royal Engineers
Captain Francis Savage Nesbitt Savage-Armstrong, South Staffordshire Regiment
Major James Alexander Scarlett, Royal Artillery
Captain Charles Baliol Scott, Duke of Cornwall's Light Infantry
Major Horace Somerville Sewell, 4th Royal Irish Dragoon Guards
Major Herbert Stoney Smith, Leicestershire Regiment
Captain Lionel Culme Soltau-Symons, Durham Light Infantry (attached Northumberland Fusiliers)
Major Edward Anthony Steel, Royal Regiment of Artillery
Major Henry Calvert Stanley-Clarke, Royal Regiment of Artillery
Major Noel St Vincent Ramsey Stewart, 18th Queen Mary's Own Hussars
Major Patrick Alexander Vansittart Stewart, King's Own Scottish Borderers
Major Ian Stewart, Scottish Rifles
Major John Henry Keith Stewart, Indian Army
Major George Herbert Stobart, Royal Artillery
Major John Arkwright Strick, King's Shropshire Light Infantry
Major Henry Homes Sutherland, Black Watch (Royal Highlanders)
Major Charles Bertie Owen Symons, Royal Engineers
Captain James John Bonifant Tapley, Army Veterinary Corps
Major Robert Joseph Atkinson Terry , Royal Sussex Regiment
Major William Brooke Thornton, Princess Charlotte of Wales's (Royal Berkshire Regiment)
Captain Edward Guy Lethbridge Thurlow, Somerset Light Infantry
Major William Herbert Trevor, East Kent Regiment
Major Arthur Jervois Turner, Royal Regiment of Artillery
Major David Keltie Tweedie, Royal Regiment of Artillery
Major Edward Heron Varwell, Territorial Force, Wessex Divisional Signal Company
Major Louis Ridley Vaughan, Indian Army
Captain John Patrick Villiers-Stuart, Indian Army
Captain Basil Walcot, Royal Engineers
Major Henry Alexander Walker, Royal Fusiliers
Major Harry Ward, Royal Regiment of Artillery
Major Albert Lambert Ward, Honourable Artillery Company (Territorial Force)
Brevet Major James Thorpe Weatherby, Oxfordshire and Buckinghamshire Light Infantry
Major George Alexander Weir, 3rd Dragoon Guards
Major Arthur Clement Wilkinson, Royal Regiment of Artillery
Captain Frank Godfrey Willan, King's Royal Rifle Corps
Major Eric Randal Gordon Wilmer, Royal Regiment of Artillery
Major Henry Walter Wynter, Royal Regiment of Artillery
Major Hugh Greville Young, Royal Regiment of Artillery

Canada
Captain Christopher Geoffrey Arthur, 10th Canadian Battalion
Lieutenant-Colonel William Watt Burland, 14th Canadian Battalion
Major James Ballantine, 4th Canadian Battalion
Captain Hugh Alexander Chisholm, Canadian Army Medical Corps
Major Gilbert Godson-Godson, 16th Canadian Battalion
Lieutenant-Colonel Hubert Kemmis Betty, 1st Canadian Division, Staff
Lieutenant-Colonel Garnet Burk Hughes, 1st Canadian Division, Staff
Major William Birchall Macaulay King, 10th Battery, 3rd Canadian Artillery Brigade
Major Frederick Alexander Lister, Canadian Divisional Signal Company
Lieutenant-Colonel Frederick Oscar Warren Loomis, 13th Canadian Battalion
Major William Renwick Marshall, 15th Canadian Battalion
Major Harold Halford Matthews, 8th Canadian Battalion
Major George Seabrook Thomas Pragnell, 5th Canadian Battalion
Captain James Howden MacBrien, 1st Canadian Division, Staff
Captain Alexander Macphail, 1st Field Company, Canadian Engineers
Captain Thomas Henry McKillip, Canadian Army Medical Corps
Captain John Hegan Parks, 1st Canadian Battalion

British India
Major Harry Beauchamp Douglas Baird, 12th Cavalry
Captain Gerard William Burton, 39th Garhwal Rifles
Captain Marmaduke Torin Cramer-Roberts, 4th Gurkha Rifles
Lieutenant-Colonel Hugh Wilson Cruddas, 41st Dogras
Captain John Acheson Staines Daniell, 14th King George's Own Ferozepore Sikhs (attached 15th Ludhiana Sikhs)
Major John Arthur Hannyngton , 129th Duke of Connaught's Own Baluchis
Major Arthur Kyffin Heyland, Supply and Transport Corps
Captain Arthur Thomas Sheringham, 121st Pioneers (attached 107th Pioneers)
Captain John Taylor , Indian Medical Service (attached 39th Garhwal Rifles)
Major Alexander Guthrie Thomson, 58th Vaughan's Rifles (Frontier Force)
Major Thomas James Willans, 57th Wilde's Rifles (Frontier Force)

Distinguished Service Cross (DSC)
The King has been graciously pleased to give orders for the following award of the Distinguished Service Cross in respect of the undermentioned Officers, in recognition of their services with the Mediterranean Expeditionary Force.

Lieutenant Ernest G. Boissier, Royal Naval Volunteer Reserve, Howe Battalion, Royal Naval Division.
Lieutenant James Cheetham, Royal Marine Light Infantry, Chatham Battalion, Royal Marine Brigade, Royal Naval Division.
Lieutenant George Spence Davidson, Royal Naval Volunteer Reserve, Anson Battalion, Royal Naval Division.

Military Cross (MC) 
The Rev. Wilfred Henry Abbot, Army Chaplains' Department, Church of England
2nd Lieutenant Alexander Ralph Abercrombie, Queen's (Royal West Surrey Regiment) (attached East Surrey Regiment)
Lieutenant Viscount A. C. M. B. Acheson, Coldstream Guards
The Rev. J. E. Adams, Army Chaplains' Department, Presbyterian
Lieutenant J. C. Aitken, Argyll and Sutherland Highlanders (Princess Louise's)
Lieutenant Trevor Rhys Allaway, South Wales Borderers (attached Welsh Regiment)
Captain Henry Irving Ramsay Allfrey, Somerset Light Infantry
2nd Lieutenant W. Anderson, Northumberland Fusiliers
Captain Robert Edward Anstruther, Black Watch (Royal Highlanders)
2nd Lieutenant R. A. Archer, Royal Regiment of Artillery (attached Royal Flying Corps)
Captain W. F. Armstrong, Royal Regiment of Artillery
Lieutenant J. C. Armstrong, Army Service Corps
Captain Kenneth Hugh Lowden Arnott, East Lancashire Regiment
Lieutenant B. G. Atkin, Manchester Regiment (attached West African Regiment)
Captain James Hozier Gardiner Baird, Bedfordshire Regiment
Sergeant-Major R. A. Baldwin, Essex Regiment
Lieutenant G. W. Barclay, Rifle Brigade (Prince Consort's Own) 
Captain J. Bartholomew, Gordon Highlanders
Captain H. H. Bateman, Royal Engineers
2nd Lieutenant J. F. Batten, Royal Regiment of Artillery
Lieutenant John Alexander Langford Batten-Pooll, 5th Royal Irish Lancers
Captain A. E. Beattie, Queen's (Royal West Surrey Regiment) (attached Nigeria Regiment)
Captain Philip Sanders Lonsdale Beaver, Wiltshire Regiment (Duke of Edinburgh's)
Lieutenant R. H. E. Bennett, Prince Albert's (Somerset Light Infantry)
2nd Lieutenant Cyril Ernest William Birkett, Prince Albert's (Somerset Light Infantry) (attached King's Royal Rifle Corps)
Captain Arthur John Walcot Blencowe, Lancashire Fusiliers
Captain Graham Bromhead Bosanquet, Gloucestershire Regiment
Lieutenant Anthony Charles Stevens Bovill, Queen's Royal Lancers
Company Sergeant-Major George Braid Bowstead, Special Reserve (Postal Section)
Captain A. R. Boyle, Argyll and Sutherland Highlanders (Princess Louise's)
Sergeant-Major T. Brasier, King's Royal Rifle Corps
2nd Lieutenant J. Brindley, East Yorkshire Regiment
Captain Ralph Howard Broome, Wiltshire Regiment (Duke of Edinburgh's)
Captain E. L. Brown, Suffolk Regiment
Captain M. Browne, Duke of Cambridge's Own (Middlesex Regiment')
Lieutenant Ian Meredith Bruce-Gardyne, Black Watch (Royal Highlanders)
Captain Eric Wilson Buckler, Worcestershire Regiment
Quartermaster and Honorary Lieutenant F. W. Burdett, Army Service Corps
Lieutenant William Eric Newton Burlton, Prince of Wales's Volunteers (South Lancashire Regiment)
Lieutenant Edmund Ernest Norbert Burney, Princess Charlotte of Wales's (Royal Berkshire Regiment)
Lieutenant Arthur Gordon Cade, Duke of Cambridge's Own (Middlesex Regiment')
Lieutenant Everard Earle Calthrop, Royal Engineers
Captain Montagu Irving Mitchell Campbell, Connaught Rangers (attached Welsh Regiment)
The Rev. Arthur Travellick Cape, Army Chaplains' Department, Wesleyan
Lieutenant Edward Hamilton Carkeet-James, Duke of Cornwall's Light Infantry
Captain T. H. Carlisle, Royal Regiment of Artillery
Quartermaster and Honorary Lieutenant J. Carr, Royal Army Medical Corps, West Riding
Regimental Sergeant-Major W. Carroll, Royal Irish Rifles
2nd Lieutenant Kenneth McClellan Cave, Royal Engineers
Captain H. F. Chads, Border Regiment
2nd Lieutenant Roger James Ferguson Chance, Royal Horse Guards
Captain John Clervaux Chaytor, South Staffordshire Regiment
Lieutenant William McMeekin Chesney , Royal Army Medical Corps
Captain John Arthur Childe-Freeman, Royal Welsh Fusiliers
Sergeant-Major Willis Cholerton, York and Lancaster Regiment
Lieutenant E. G. H. Clarke, East Surrey Regiment
Mechanist Sergeant-Major C. Clements, Army Service Corps
Lieutenant F. R. Cobb, Devonshire Regiment
Captain The Hon. Edward Coke, Rifle Brigade (Prince Consort's Own) (attached London Regiment)
Captain Percy Hugh Campbell Collins, York and Lancaster Regiment Edward
Lieutenant Edmund Percy Combe, Royal Scots (Lothian Regiment)
2nd Lieutenant R. B. Comely, Monmouthshire Regiment
Captain P. H. Compton, 6th Dragoon Guards (Carabiniers)
Staff Sergeant-Major J. Connell, Army Service Corps
Captain George Loyd Courthope, Royal Sussex Regiment
Captain Stephen Howard Neal Coxon, Royal Warwickshire Regiment
Capt. Herbert Charles Crozier, 1st Battalion, The Royal Dublin Fusiliers
Temp. Lieutenant D. D. Craig , Royal Army Medical Corps
Lieutenant Francis Savile Crossley, Queen's Royal Lancers
Lieutenant Guy Lindsay Cruikshank, Royal Flying Corps, Gordon Highlanders
Captain J. Dare, Loyal Forth Lancashire Regiment
Captain W. Darling , Royal Army Medical Corps
Lieutenant Thomas Herbert Darwell, East Surrey Regiment
Sergeant-Major Vivian Hugh Stuart Davenport, Border Regiment
Captain F. E. Davies, Worcestershire Regiment
Captain G. F. Dawson , Royal Army Medical Corps (attached Royal Highlanders)
Captain M. F. Day, King's Own (Yorkshire Light Infantry)
Second Lieutenant Neville Lindney Clemond De Rinzy, East Yorkshire Regiment
Lieutenant James Viner Delahaye, Royal Regiment of Artillery
Lieutenant B. C. Dening, Royal Engineers
Lieutenant Frederick Joseph Aglis Dibdin, Royal Sussex Regiment (attached Welsh Regiment)
Lieutenant James MacNeece Dickie, Royal Dublin Fusiliers
2nd Lieutenant Cathcart Eric Stewart Dobbs, Army Service Corps
Captain M. G. Douglas, Honourable Artillery Company (Territorial Force)
Captain S. D. Douglas-Jones, Royal Regiment of Artillery
Lieutenant Guy Percy Lumsden Drake-Brockman, Border Regiment
2nd Lieutenant William Draycott-Wood, South Staffordshire Regiment
Lieutenant J. L. Drummond, Royal Scots Fusiliers
The Rev. W. Drury , Army Chaplains' Department, Church of England
Quartermaster and Honorary Lieutenant H. Dugdale, Royal Army Medical Corps, 3rd East Lancashire Field Ambulance
Bandmaster W. J. Dunn, King's Royal Rifle Corps
Captain P. Dwyer , Royal Army Medical Corps
Lieutenant Oliver Pearce Edgcumbe, Duke of Cornwall's Light Infantry
2nd Lieutenant J. D. Edge, Royal Regiment of Artillery
Captain	Kenneth Essex Edgeworth, Royal Engineers
Captain Charles O'Reilly Edwards, Royal Engineers
Captain F. H. Edwards, Bedfordshire Regiment
Captain A. H. Edwards, Monmouthshire Regiment
Second Lieutenant J. H. Eliot, 3rd King's Own Hussars 
Lieutenant C. W. Evans, South Staffordshire Regiment
Lieutenant R. J. V. Falkner, 4th Queen's Own Hussars
2nd Lieutenant Harry Wyndham Francis Blackburne Farrer, Royal Regiment of Artillery
Lieutenant J. O. Farrer, King's Shropshire Light Infantry
Captain R. T. Fellowes, Rifle Brigade
Captain St. John Lucius O'Brien Acheson ffrench Blake, 21st Empress of India's Lancers
Lieutenant G. A. Fisher, King's Royal Rifle Corps
Lieutenant Conway Victor Fisher-Rowe, Grenadier Guards
Captain Lord Desmond FitzGerald, Irish Guards
Captain Edward Herbert Fitzherbert, Army Service Corps
Lieutenant W. A. Fleming, Devonshire Regiment
Captain I. G. Fleming, Gordon Highlanders
Captain H. J. Flower, King's Royal Rifle Corps (attached London Regiment)
Captain The Hon. Bertram Marmaduke Osbert Savile Foljambe, Prince of Wales's Own (West Yorkshire Regiment)
Captain O. B. Foster, Northumberland Fusiliers
Captain J. F. Franks, King's Royal Rifle Corps
Captain Charles St Quentin Outen Fullbrook-Leggatt , Princess Charlotte of Wales's (Royal Berkshire Regiment)
Lieutenant H. M. Gale, Army Service Corps
Lieutenant Gerald Ion Gartlan, Royal Irish Rifles
2nd Lieutenant J. Giffen, Queen's Own Cameron Highlanders
2nd Lieutenant R. Gillespie, King's Own Scottish Borderers
Lieutenant H. R. Glen, Army Service Corps
Captain Walter Hugh Godsal, Durham Light Infantry
Captain Claude le Bas Goldney, Army Service Corps
Captain Burford Henryson Goodhart, Wiltshire Regiment (Duke of Edinburgh's)
Captain John Standish Surtees Prendergast Vereker, Viscount Gort  Grenadier Guards
Lieutenant Kenneth Ian Gourlay, Royal Engineers
Captain F. R. W. Graham, Royal Irish Rifles
Captain Lord Douglas Malise Graham, Royal Artillery
Captain F. N. Grant, Royal Sussex Regiment
2nd Lieutenant Walter Stuart Wingate Gray, Royal Regiment of Artillery
Captain Eric Beresford Greer, Irish Guards
Captain The Hon. Richard Eustace Grosvenor, Royal Regiment of Artillery
Lieutenant Benjamin George Gunner, Northumberland Fusiliers
Captain H. W. Hall, 2nd Dragoon Guards (Queen's Bays)
Captain F. A. C. Hamilton, Cameronians (Scottish Rifles)
Lieutenant Walter Francis Hanna, Royal Engineers
2nd Lieutenant G. H. Harbord, Royal Regiment of Artillery (attached 1st Canadian Division)
Captain H. S. Hardy, Buffs (East Kent Regiment)
Quartermaster and Honorary Lieutenant C. E. Harford, Royal Horse Guards
Captain G. E. Hawes, Royal Fusiliers (City of London Regiment) (attached London Regiment)
Captain Mansell William Lamb Hawkes, Royal Munster Fusiliers
Captain John Richardson Heelis, Manchester Regiment
Captain O. C. Herbert, Argyll and Sutherland Highlanders
Captain H. W. Herring, Royal Engineers
Lieutenant William George Hewett, Welsh Regiment
Captain R. Hewlett, Royal Fusiliers (City of London Regiment)
Temp. Lieutenant F. T. Hill, Royal Army Medical Corps
Lieutenant James Wilfred Lang Stanley Hobart, Prince of Wales's (North Staffordshire Regiment)
2nd Lieutenant J. Hobbs, Royal Scots (Lothian Regiment)
Lieutenant J. F. Hodges, Royal Irish Fusiliers (Princess Victoria's)
Sergeant-Major C. Hodgkinson, Worcestershire Regiment
Captain Herbert Arthur Reginald Hoffmeister, King's Shropshire Light Infantry
Lieutenant U. S. Holden, Army Service Corps
Acting Sergeant-Major R. M. Holmes, 1st (King's) Dragoon Guards
Lieutenant Lord Hans Wellesley Holmpatrick, 16th The Queen's Lancers
Captain R. Horn, Seaforth Highlanders (Ross-shire Buffs, Duke of Albany's)
Captain H. L. Howell, Royal Army Medical Corps
Lieutenant L. J. Hudleston, Duke of Cambridge's Own (Middlesex Regiment')
Captain William Tyers Christopher Huffam, Prince of Wales's Own (West Yorkshire Regiment)
Captain A. J. Hunter, King's Royal Rifle Corps
Captain R. H. Husey, London Regiment, 5th Battalion (London Rifle Brigade)
Captain H. O. Hutchison, Royal Regiment of Artillery
Lieutenant T. J. Hutton, Royal Regiment of Artillery
2nd Lieutenant T. Hutton, Duke of Wellington's (West Riding Regiment)
Captain Edward Hastings Impey, Lincolnshire Regiment
Captain C. D. Irwin, Manchester Regiment
Lieutenant B. T. James, Royal Flying Corps, Royal Engineers
Temp. Lieutenant P. W. James , Royal Army Medical Corps
Temp. Lieutenant H. G. Janion, Royal Army Medical Corps
Lieutenant Frederick Oliver St. John, Royal Scots (Lothian Regiment) (attached 35th Divisional Signal Company)
Captain H. H. Joll, Royal Regiment of Artillery
Captain J. B. Jones , Royal Army Medical Corps
Captain E. J. Kavanagh , Royal Army Medical Corps
The Rev. William Keatinge, Army Chaplains' Department, Roman Catholic
Lieutenant W. Kerr, Border Regiment
Capt. Horace Augustus Kirby, Royal Artillery (26th Jacob's Mountain Battery)
Sergeant-Major J. Kirk, Irish Guards
Captain Charles Leycester Knyvett, Royal Regiment of Artillery
2nd Lieutenant F. P. Lacy, Territorial Force (Westmorland and Cumberland Yeomanry)
Captain R. W. Lamb, Royal Regiment of Artillery
2nd Lieutenant John Frederick Lascelles, Royal Flying Corps, Rifle Brigade
Lieutenant George Alexander Ledingham, Royal Engineers
Captain G. Lee, Buffs (East Kent Regiment)
Captain G. M. Lee, Royal Fusiliers (City of London Regiment)
Captain C. S. Linton, Worcestershire Regiment
Lieutenant C. M. Lister, Royal Regiment of Artillery
Temp. Lieutenant W. H. Lister, Royal Army Medical Corps
Captain A. M. O. J. Lloyd, South Wales Borderers
Lieutenant H. C. Lloyd, King's Royal Rifle Corps
Captain C. C. Lucas, Royal Artillery
Captain L. W. Lucas, Buffs (East Kent Regiment)
Captain S. T. Lucey, Loyal North Lancashire Regiment
Captain The Hon. Robert Lygon , Grenadier Guards
Captain A. I. Macdougall, 5th Royal Irish Lancers
Temp. Lieutenant I. C. Maclean , Royal Army Medical Corps
Capt. Jasper Kenneth Gordon Magee, 4th Australian Infantry Battalion (New South Wales).
Temp. 2nd Lieutenant Thomas Bertram Joseph Mahar, King's Royal Rifle Corps
Lieutenant James Francis Marsland, Prince of Wales's Leinster Regiment (Royal Canadians)
Lieutenant Giffard Le Quesne Martel, Royal Engineers
Lieutenant A. Maxwell, Royal Regiment of Artillery
Captain B. McKinnell, King's (Liverpool Regiment)
Lieutenant W. S. Meeke, Duke of Cambridge's Own (Middlesex Regiment) (attached Royal Munster Fusiliers)
Captain John Vincent Meredith, Prince of Wales's Leinster Regiment (Royal Canadians)
Captain Hugh Mowbray Meyler, Duke of Cambridge's Own (Middlesex Regiment')
Lieutenant G. W. Miller, King's (Liverpool Regiment)
2nd Lieutenant F. Milnes, 2nd Dragoon Guards (Queen's Bays)
2nd Lieutenant R. G. Moir, Argyll and Sutherland Highlanders (Princess Louise's)
Lieutenant Charles Willoughby Moke Norrie, 11th Prince Albert's Own Hussars
The Rev. John Patrick Molony, Army Chaplains' Department, Roman Catholic
Sergeant-Major J. Moore, King's Own (Yorkshire Light Infantry)
2nd Lieutenant A. R. Moore, London Regiment, 4th Battalion (Royal Fusiliers)
Captain Howel Gwyn Moore-Gwyn, Rifle Brigade (Prince Consort's Own) 
Second Lieutenant D. N. Morgan, Royal Regiment of Artillery
2nd Lieutenant F. J. Morley, Dorsetshire Regiment
2nd Lieutenant C. H. Morris, Dorsetshire Regiment
Captain Edward F. Moulton-Barrett, Queen's Own Royal West Kent Regiment
Second Lieutenant Dennis Joseph St. Claire Mullaly, Royal Regiment of Artillery
2nd Lieutenant John Hardy Musson, Queen's (Royal West Surrey Regiment)
Captain F. A. Nicolson, 15th The King's Hussars
Captain Humphrey Donatus Stafford O'Brien, Northamptonshire Regiment (attached Nigeria Regiment)
2nd Lieutenant Wilfred Francis Lann Oliver, Durham Light Infantry
Captain W. L. Palmer, 10th Hussars
Lieutenant Ashley Pole Pargiter, Royal Irish Regiment
2nd Lieutenant A. J. Parkes, Royal Engineers
Sergeant-Major O. W. Parkinson, Suffolk Regiment
Captain R. E. Partridge, Dorsetshire Regiment
Lieutenant J. Paterson, London Regiment, 14th Battalion (London Scottish)
Lieutenant R. W. Patteson, Norfolk Regiment
Captain Guy Barnett Pears, Royal Engineers
Sergeant-Major J. Pell, Dorsetshire Regiment
2nd Lieutenant James William Pendlebury, East Lancashire Regiment
Captain J. Penrose, Royal Regiment of Artillery
Capt. Arthur Guy Leslie Pepys, 1st Battalion, The Essex Regiment.
Captain Francis George Prescot Philips, King's Shropshire Light Infantry (attached Manchester Regiment)
Captain R. Pigot, Rifle Brigade (Prince Consort's Own) 
Captain Ebenezer John Lecky Pike, Grenadier Guards
Captain Robert Henry Pipon, Royal Fusiliers (City of London Regiment)
Captain Henry Chambre Ponsonby, King's Royal Rifle Corps
The Rev. A. E. Popham, Army Chaplains' Department, Church of England
Lieutenant D. H. Pratt, Royal Irish Regiment
Captain F. Preedy, Royal Engineers
Lieutenant R. A. Preston , Royal Army Medical Corps
Lieutenant G. E. R Prior, Devonshire Regiment
Regimental Sergeant-Major W. Pritchard, Devonshire Regiment
Captain H. M. Pryce-Jones, Coldstream Guards
Captain L. C. Rattray, King's Royal Rifle Corps
Captain A. K. Reid, Highland Light Infantry
Capt. Clifford Russell Richardson, 2nd Australian Infantry Battalion (New South Wales).
Captain E. D. Ridley, Grenadier Guards
Lieutenant Robert Collingwood H. Roddam, Northumberland Fusiliers
Captain W. K. Rollo, Alexandra Princess of Wales's Own (Yorkshire Regiment)
Captain R. H. Rowe, Royal Regiment of Artillery
Captain H. K. Sadler, Royal Regiment of Artillery
Captain Samuel John Marton Sampson, London Regiment, 9th Battalion (Queen Victoria's Rifles)
Captain A. L. Samson, Royal Welsh Fusiliers
Sergeant-Major H. Savill, Royal Fusiliers (City of London Regiment)
2nd Lieutenant O. W. Sherwell, Royal Regiment of Artillery
Captain L. F. Smeathman, Hertfordshire Regiment
Temp. Lieutenant P. Smith, Royal Army Medical Corps
Honorary Lieutenant S. N. Smith, Army Ordnance Department
Captain H. J. Solomon, Army Service Corps
Captain W. M. Sutton, Prince Albert's (Somerset Light Infantry)
Staff Sergeant-Major W. E. Spalding, Army Service Corps
Honorary Captain Percy William Montague Sparey, Army Ordnance Department
Captain F. A. Spencer, Army Service Corps
Lieutenant J. H. Stafford, Royal Engineers
Lieutenant R. N. Stewart, Queen's Own Cameron Highlanders
Lieutenant G. H. Straker, 15th Hussars
Captain John William Cotter Stubbs , Royal Army Medical Corps
Lieutenant R. H. Studdert, Royal Regiment of Artillery
2nd Lieutenant A. Sutherland, Queen's Own Cameron Highlanders
Captain Charles Francis Trollope Swan, Rifle Brigade (Prince Consort's Own) 
Lieutenant Alan Henry Campbell Swinton, Scots Guards
Captain F. S. Thackeray, Highland Light Infantry
Captain Charles Robert Thropp Thorp, King's Own (Yorkshire Light Infantry) (Signal Service)
Captain Stuart Harman Joseph Thunder, Northamptonshire Regiment
2nd Lieutenant E. F. Tickell, Royal Engineers
Captain J. E. Tindall, Territorial Force, 1st Home Counties Field Company
Lieutenant W. G. Tolson, Oxfordshire and Buckinghamshire Light Infantry
Captain C. T. Tomes, Royal Warwickshire Regiment
Quartermaster and Honorary Captain F. Tomlinson, Sherwood Foresters (Nottinghamshire and Derbyshire Regiment)
Captain William Tidswell Towers-Clark, Coldstream Guards
Lieutenant J. S. Townshend, South Staffordshire Regiment
Captain Derrick le Poer Trench, Royal Regiment of Artillery
Lieutenant J. A. Turner, Royal Regiment of Artillery
Lieutenant R. M. Vaughan, Royal Flying Corps, Royal Inniskilling Fusiliers
Captain G. E. Vaughan, Coldstream Guards
Captain H. F. Vellacott , Royal Army Medical Corps
Captain Walter King Venning, Duke of Cornwall's Light Infantry (attached London Regiment)
Captain William Henry McNeile Verschoyle-Campbell, Army Ordnance Department, Royal Artillery
2nd Lieutenant N. M. Vibart, Royal Engineers
Captain A. C. Vicary, Gloucestershire Regiment
2nd Lieutenant Bentley Herbert Waddy, Gloucestershire Regiment (attached Bedfordshire Regiment)
Sergeant-Major G. B. Walker, Royal Army Medical Corps
Lieutenant C. J. Wallace, Highland Light Infantry
Captain H. W. L. Waller, Royal Artillery
Captain M. R. Walsh, Worcestershire Regiment
Lieutenant Frederic Angus Wanklyn, Royal Flying Corps, Royal Artillery
Captain Edward Courtenay Thomas Warner, Scots Guards
2nd Lieutenant R. A. Watson, Royal Regiment of Artillery
Captain J. Watson, Royal Engineers
Captain A. P. Wavell, Royal Highlanders
Lieutenant Marshall William Traheme Webb, Royal Engineers
Captain D. L. Weir, Leicestershire Regiment
Lieutenant T. Wells, King's Own (Yorkshire Light Infantry)
Lieutenant J. S. T. Weston, Royal Warwickshire Regiment (attached Royal Berkshire Regiment)
2nd Lieutenant George Ferris Whidborne, Coldstream Guards
Captain F. S. Whinney, Lincolnshire Regiment
Captain N. T. Whitehead , Royal Army Medical Corps
Lieutenant J. L. Whitty, Prince of Wales's Leinster Regiment (Royal Canadians)
Lieutenant James Lugard Willcocks, Royal Highlanders
Captain E. C. T. B. Williams, Suffolk Regiment
Captain 	Edward William G. Wilson, Royal Regiment of Artillery
2nd Lieutenant M. D. Wilson, Queen's (Royal West Surrey Regiment) (attached Lincolnshire Regiment)
Captain H. G. Winter, Royal Army Medical Corps
Captain A. B. Woodgate, King's Own (Royal Lancaster Regiment)
Captain R. H. Woods, King's Royal Rifle Corps
Staff Sergeant-Major W. W. Woods, Army Service Corps
Captain 	Charles de Witte Woodyer, Cheshire Regiment
Captain J. H. Young, Argyll and Sutherland Highlanders (Princess Louise's)

Canada
Captain G. M. Alexander, 15th Canadian Battalion
Captain Alfred Kimball Haywood, Medical Corps (attached 3rd Canadian Battalion)
Lieutenant Colville Eyre Crabbe, Princess Patricia's Canadian Light Infantry
Lieutenant Halfdan Fenton Harboe Hertzberg, 2nd Field Company, Canadian Engineers
Captain Josiah Sherlock Marrington Arthur Haigh Lyne-Evans, 3rd Canadian Battalion
Lieutenant Norman George Morrison McLeod, 8th Canadian Battalion
Lieutenant James Herbert Scandrett, 12th Battery, 3rd Canadian Artillery Brigade
Lieutenant J. M. Scott, 8th Canadian Battalion
Captain A. G. Turner, 2nd Canadian Battalion
Lieutenant Ralph Webb, Canadian Army Service Corps
Regimental Sergeant-Major J. Jeffrey, 13th Canadian Battalion

British India
Lieutenant A. E. Barstow, 15th Ludhiana Sikhs
Captain Basil de Lisle Brock, 126th Baluchistan Infantry
Lieutenant Frederick Cromie de Butts, 55th Coke's Rifles (Frontier Force) (attached 31st (Divisional Signal) Company)
Lieutenant Ernle James Corse-Scott, 2nd King Edward's Own Gurkha Rifles (Sirmoor Rifles)
Lieutenant E. K. Fowler, 57th Wilde's Rifles (Frontier Force)
Lieutenant Forrester Metcalfe Griffith-Griffin, 129th Duke of Connaught's Own Baluchis
Captain Meredith Ashton Hamer, 129th Duke of Connaught's Own Baluchis
Captain Ernest Frederick John Hill, 1st King George's Own Sappers and Miners, Royal Engineers
Captain Percy Cleghorn Stanley Hobart, 1st King George's Own Sappers and Miners, Royal Engineers
Captain G. Howson, 4th Cavalry
Captain C. E. Hunt, 34th Sikh Pioneers
Subadar Arsla Khan , 57th Wilde's Rifles (Frontier Force)
Lieutenant H. V. Lewis, 129th Duke of Connaught's Own Baluchis
Lieutenant Eugene Lancelot Erskine Lindop, 41st Dogras
Captain E. B. Mangin, 107th Pioneers
Lieutenant Henry John Minniken, West India Regiment (attached West African Regiment)
Lieutenant Charles Francis Fitzgerald Moore, 123rd Outram's Rifles (attached 4th Gurkha Rifles)
Jemadar Sangram Singh Negi, 39th Garhwal Rifles
Lieutenant J. Nethersole, 25th Cavalry (Frontier Force) (attached 2nd Life Guards)
Captain J. S. O'Neill , Indian Medical Service
Captain W. Odell, 123rd Outram's Rifles (attached 125th Napier Rifles
Jemadar Bishan Singh Rawat, 39th Garhwal Rifles
Lieutenant John Allan Mackay Scobie, 59th Scinde Rifles (Frontier Force)
2nd Class Sub-Assistant Surgeon Ramkrishna Ganpat Shinde, Indian Medical Service (attached 39th Garhwal Rifles)
Captain A. D. Smith, 2nd King Edward's Own Gurkha Rifles (Sirmoor Rifles)
Lieutenant Francis Benton Newport Tinley, 20th Deccan Horse
Lieutenant Harold Lithgow Watkis, 37th Lancers (Baluch Horse)

Conspicuous Gallantry Medal (CGM)
Chief Petty Officer Richard Farley Toy, Howe Battalion.
Able Seaman George Henry Doe, Howe Battalion.
Private Charles J. Braddock, Royal Marine Light Infantry, RFRB, Chatham Battalion.
Bugler Ernest Sillence, Royal Marine Light Infantry, Chatham Battalion.

Distinguished Service Medal (DSM)
Petty Officer Walter Mason, Drake Battalion.
Leading Seaman John Rogerson, Anson Battalion.
Stoker Herbert Horace Purnell, Hood Battalion.
Sgt. N. Roberts, Royal Marine Light Infantry, Field Ambulance.
Private George Stockham, Royal Naval Auxiliary Sick Berth Reserve, Plymouth Battalion.

Distinguished Conduct Medal (DCM) 

Citation —His Majesty the KING has been graciously pleased to approve of the award to the undermentioned Warrant Officers, Non-commissioned Officers and Men, for acts of gallantry and devotion to duty whilst serving with the Expeditionary Force in France and Flanders:

Company-Sergeant-Major E. W. Abbott, 1st Battalion, Hertfordshire Regiment
Lance-Sergeant G. A. Abbott, 1st Battalion, Middlesex Regiment
Signaller-Sergeant E. A. Adams, 5th City of London Battalion, London Regiment (London Rifle Brigade)
Private H. M. Adams, Canadian Signal Company
Private W. Adams, 2nd Battalion, South Wales Borderers (recently of the 1st Battalion)
Acting Sergeant S. L. Adamson, 3rd Canadian Battalion
Gunner G. Addisson, 45th Battery, Royal Field Artillery
Private C. Allen, 2nd Battalion, South Staffordshire Regiment
Lance-Corporal G. W. Allan, 10th Canadian Battalion
Lance-Corporal D. Allison, 9th (Glasgow Highland) Battalion, Highland Light Infantry
Corporal W. Amison, 1st Battalion, North Staffordshire Regiment
Lance-Corporal G. Anderson, 1/5th (Angus and Dundee) Battalion, Royal Highlanders
Bandsman J. Anderson, 1st Battalion, Middlesex Regiment
Company-Sergeant-Major A. A. Anderton, Army Service Corps
Acting Company-Quartermaster Serjeant A. Andrews, 2nd Battalion, Highland Light Infantry
Private H. J. Andrews, 2nd Battalion, Scottish Rifles (attached 8th Signal Company)
Sergeant A. Archibald, 6th (Banff and Donside) Battalion, Gordon Highlanders
Company-Serjeaut-Major F. Ariss, 1st Battalion, Royal Warwickshire Regiment
Sergeant J. Arthur, 2nd Battalion, Cameron Highlanders
Sergeant W. Ashworth, 1st Battalion, Liverpool Regiment
Company-Sergeant-Major C. Asplin, 2nd Battalion, Northamptonshire Regiment
Lance-Corporal E. J. Austin, 2nd Battalion, Grenadier Guards
Second Corporal G. Austin, 59th Company, Royal Engineers
Staff-Sergeant-Major F. C. Avis, Army Service Corps
Sergeant W. Badcock, 1st Battalion, Shropshire Light Infantry
Private W. H. Baker, 2nd Battalion, Lancashire Fusiliers
Private W. Ball, 2nd Battalion, Grenadier Guards
Lance-Corporal J. Barber, 2nd Battalion, Essex Regiment
Sergeant E. A. Barnes, 26th Field Company, Royal Engineers
Private C. Barry, 2nd Battalion, Royal Munster Fusiliers
Acting Corporal W. Bartlett, 2nd Battalion, Bedfordshire Regiment
Private C. W. Batchelor, 2nd Canadian Battalion
Sergeant V. Batty, 2nd Battalion, Royal Lancaster Regiment
Lance-Corporal J. Beagin, 1/7th Battalion, Worcestershire Regiment
Sergeant J. Bean, Army Service Corps
Private F. Beaney, 8th Divisional Cyclist Company, Army Cyclist Corps (late Rifle Brigade)
Acting Company Sergeant-Major R. Bell, 1st Battalion, Highland Light Infantry
Gunner E. Bennett, 15th Brigade, Royal Field Artillery
Private G. Bennett, 1/5th Battalion, North Staffordshire Regiment
Company-Quartermaster-Sergeant J. H. Bennett, 2nd Battalion, Rifle Brigade
Corporal B. Benton, 9th Field Company, Royal Engineers
Lance-Corporal J. Berry, 2nd Battalion, Highland Light Infantry
Acting Bombardier A. Beswick, 73rd Battery, Royal Field Artillery
Corporal W. H. Bethell, 55th Field Company, Royal Engineers
Sergeant R. W. Biart, 5th Signal Company, Royal Engineers
Private R. Binks, 2nd Battalion, King's Royal Rifle Corps
Private R. W Birdseye, 2nd Canadian Battalion
Corporal E. Bishop, 54th Battery, Royal Field Artillery
Acting Company-Sergeant-Major W. Blackman, 2nd Battalion, East Surrey Regiment
Lance-Corporal R. Blakernan, 1st Battalion, Worcestershire Regiment
Private W. Blanton, 2nd Battalion, Cheshire Regiment,
Private T. J. Bloomfield, 2nd Battalion, West Yorkshire Regiment
Private C. H. Bloxham, 10th Canadian Battalion
Sergeant F. W. Borley, 1st Battalion, Royal Irish Fusiliers
Corporal F. Bowler, 2nd Battalion, Nottinghamshire and Derbyshire Regiment
Lance-Corporal E. Boxall, 2nd Battalion, Royal Munster Fusiliers
Company Sergeant-Major T. Brannan, 1st Battalion, Royal Scots (Lothian Regiment)
Sergeant P. Breach, 2nd Battalion, Oxfordshire and Buckinghamshire Light-Infantry
Sapper W. H. Brett, 9th Field Company, Royal Engineers
Private C. Briggs, 2nd Battalion, Lincolnshire Regiment
Private C. J. Brooks, 1st Battalion, Royal Scots Fusiliers
Sergeant J. Brooks, 2nd Battalion, Royal Munster Fusiliers
Company Sergeant-Major A. Brown, 1st Battalion, East Kent Regiment
Sapper A. C. Brown, 11th Field Company, Royal Engineers
Sergeant A. S. Brown, 2nd Battalion, Bedfordshire Regiment
Sergeant F. C. Brown, NCable Section, Royal Engineers
Lance-Corporal O. J. Brown, 1st Northumbrian Field Company, Royal Engineers
Sergeant T. M. Brown, Canadian Army Medical Corps
Sergeant W. Brown, 110th Battery, Royal Field Artillery
Acting Lance-Corporal A. Brownley, 1st Battalion, Lincolnshire Regiment
Lance-Corporal C. Brownlow, 1st Battalion, East Yorkshire Regiment
Private E. Bunsell, 1st Battalion, Royal West Kent Regiment
Sergeant E. C. Burgess, 9th County of London Battalion, London Regiment (Queen Victoria's Rifles) 
Acting Sergeant T. Burgess, 116th Battery, Royal Field Artillery
Acting Sergeant G. Burnett, 1st Battalion, Royal Highlanders
Pioneer G. P. Burns, 1st Signal Co., Royal Engineers
Private G. Burrell, 7th Battalion, Northumberland Fusiliers
Private J. Burridge, 2nd Battalion, Welsh Regiment
Sergeant E. F. Burrows, 2nd Battalion, Royal Berkshire Regiment
Sergeant A. Busby, 2nd Battalion, South Staffordshire Regiment
Acting Company Sergeant-Major B. Butcher, 2nd Battalion, Royal Sussex Regiment
Gunner A. Butler, 1st Siege Battery, Royal Garrison Artillery
Sergeant E. Butler, 1st Battalion, North Staffordshire Regiment
Lance-Corporal F. Butler, 1st Battalion, Royal Berkshire Regiment
Private F. R. Butler, 1st Battalion, Northamptonshire Regiment
Private C. Button, 1st Battalion, West Yorkshire Regiment
Company Quartermaster-Sergeant F. O. Bytheway, 1st Battalion, South Staffordshire Regiment
Lance-Corporal H. Cairns, 1st Battalion, Royal Irish Rifles
Sergeant J. M. Calder, 15th Canadian Battalion
Acting Corporal A. Carey, 1st Battalion, Cheshire Regiment
Private J. Carr, 2nd Battalion, Lancashire Fusiliers
Sergeant R. H. Carr (now Second Lieutenant in Special Reserve of Officers), Royal Flying Corps
Acting Sergeant F. Carrington, 2nd Battalion, West Riding Regiment
Sergeant T. B. Carter (19th Field Ambulance), Royal Army Medical Corps
Private J. Cartwright, 14th Field Ambulance), Royal Army Medical Corps
Lance-Corporal R. J. Casement, 1st Field Company, Canadian Engineers
Corporal S. Cassell, 21st Battery, Royal Field Artillery
Corporal E. Casstles, Canadian Signal Company
Sapper H. G. Catlin, 15th Field Company, Royal Engineers
Private G. O. Chadderton, 4th Battalion, Northumberland Fusiliers
Sapper S. M. Chapman, 1st General Headquarters. Signal Company, Royal Engineers
Corporal A. Charley, 42nd Brigade, Royal Field Artillery
Private W. H. Charman, 2nd Battalion, East Lancashire Regiment
Sergeant W. Chart, 1st Battalion, Nottinghamshire and Derbyshire Regiment
Lance-Corporal H. Chawk, 2nd Battalion, Gordon Highlanders
Sapper W. Chorlerton, 5th Field Company, Royal Engineers
Sergeant A. Christie, 1/5th (Angus and Dundee) Battalion, Royal Highlanders
Private G. Church, 2nd Battalion, Welsh Regiment
Corporal J. Clarkburn, 1st Battalion, Northumberland Fusiliers
Private G. Clarke, 3rd Battalion, Worcestershire Regiment
Sergeant J. Clarke, 1st Battalion, Northumberland Fusiliers
Gunner J. S. Clarke, Motor Machine Gun Service
Company-Sergeant-Major G. E. Clay, 3rd Battalion, King's Royal Rifle Corps
Sergeant S.-O. Clements, 9th Field Company, Royal Engineers
Lance-Corporal A. Cleveland, 2nd Battalion, South Lancashire Regiment
Sergeant-Major A. E. Clifton, Canadian Army Medical Corps
Private S. C. Climpson, 2nd Battalion, Northamptonshire Regiment (attached 8th Signal Company)
Acting Bombardier S. D. Collier, 109th Heavy Battery, Royal Garrison Artillery
Company-Quartermaster-Sergeant C. H. Collins, 4th Division Cyclist Company, Army Cyclist Corps (late Hampshire Regiment)
Private E. Collins, 1st Battalion, Hampshire Regiment
Gunner C. Cooke, 36th Brigade, Royal Field Artillery
Acting Sergeant W. Cooke, 2nd Battalion, Royal Dublin Fusiliers
Sergeant J. Coombe, 5th Battalion, Durham Light Infantry
Bombardier B. Coombes, 27th Brigade, Royal Field Artillery
Bombardier E. G. Cooper, 32nd Brigade, Royal Field Artillery
Private A. Copeland, 1st Battalion, Royal Irish Rifles
Sergeant R. H. Cornall, 51st Battery, Royal Field Artillery
Company-Sergeant-Major T. Corry, 1st Battalion, Irish Guards
Lance-Corporal H. Cotterill, 2nd Battalion, South Staffordshire Regiment
Acting Lance-Sergeant W. Coulson, 1st Battalion, Lincolnshire Regiment
Bandsman J. Counter, 1st Battalion, Argyll and Sutherland Highlanders
Corporal J. Cowan, 2nd Battalion, Argyll and Sutherland Highlanders
Private J. D. Cowell, 5th Canadian Battalion
Sergeant J. Coyle, 1st Battalion, Royal Irish Rifles
Private J. Coyne, 9th (Dumbartonshire) Battalion, Argyll and Sutherland Highlanders
Private W. Craig, 1st Battalion, Coldstream Guards
Sergeant J. Crane, 2nd Battalion, Royal Munster Fusiliers
Private J. Crawford, 2nd Battalion, Highland Light Infantry
Lance-Corporal W. H. Critchley, 2nd Battalion, King's Royal Rifle Corps
Sergeant H. Crook, 1st Battalion, King's Own Yorkshire Light Infantry
Sergeant F. Cross, 1st Battalion, West Yorkshire Regiment
Bombardier F. J. Cubitt, 3rd Battery, Royal Field Artillery
Private R. Cully, 1st Battalion, Leinster Regiment
Sergeant J. B. Cumper, 55th Field Company, Royal Engineers
Company-Sergeant-Major A. Curtis, 2nd Battalion, Rifle Brigade
Company-Sergeant-Major J. Dallaway, 2nd Battalion, Royal Sussex Regiment
Lance-Corporal E. Dalton, 3rd Battalion, Coldstream Guards (transferred to 170th Company, Royal Engineers)
Acting Corporal H. J. Daniels, 28th Divisional Cyclist Company, Army Cyclist Corps (late Suffolk Regiment)
Corporal T. Daniels, 14th Brigade, Royal Horse Artillery
Private H. Danson, 13th Canadian Battalion
Lance-Corporal M. Darcy, 1st Battalion, Royal Irish Rifles
Private H. C. A. Davidge, 1st Battalion, Cameron Highlanders
Sergeant H. Davidson, 24th Heavy Battery, Royal Garrison Artillery
Sergeant C. Davies, 6th Battalion, Royal Fusiliers (attached 4th Battalion)
Corporal F. Davis, 11th Field Company, Royal Engineers
Sergeant-Major J. J. Dawkins, 2nd Battalion, Royal Warwickshire Regiment
Corporal C. Dawson, 1st Battalion, Northumberland Fusiliers
Private J. Dempsey, 2nd Battalion, Suffolk Regiment
Acting Sergeant E. Dennington, 1st Battalion, Royal West Kent Regiment
Company Sergeant-Major W. S. Dingley, 1st Battalion, Duke of Cornwall's Light Infantry
Corporal W. Dobbie, Royal Flying Corps
Private J. Dodd, 3rd Battalion, King's Royal Rifle Corps
Private J. Dodds, 5th Battalion, Northumberland Fusiliers
Acting Corporal W. B. N. Doran, 33rd Battery, Royal Field Artillery
Sergeant J. Dougall, 16th Canadian Battalion
Private G. H. Dove, 2nd Battalion, West Yorkshire Regiment
Bombardier E. O. Downing, Royal Field Artillery
Acting Sergeant T. Drew, 23rd Battery, Royal Field Artillery
Lance-Corporal G. J. Driver, 12th Field Company, Royal Engineers
Sergeant W. H. Dryden, 7th Canadian Battalion
Sergeant W. Duddridge, 1st Battalion, Gloucestershire Regiment
Lance-Corporal J. W. Duffy, 56th Company, Royal Engineers
Sapper A. J. Dugdale, 1st Home Counties Field Company, Royal Engineers
Sergeant W. H. Dugmore, 2nd Battalion, Shropshire Light Infantry
Bombardier J. F. Duley, 364th Battery, Royal Field Artillery
Private W. Duncan, Canadian Signal Company
Private W. Eade, 2nd Battalion, Bedfordshire Regiment
Corporal T. Earnshaw, 1st Battalion, King's Own Yorkshire Light Infantry
Sergeant F. Eccles, 2nd Battalion, Royal Munster Fusiliers
Acting Corporal J. Edwards, 1st Battalion, South Wales Borderers
Private W. Ellingham, 1st Battalion, Northumberland Fusiliers
3rd Class Assistant Surgeon K. P. Elloy, Indian Subordinate Medical Department
Sapper W. W. Fairless, 1st Northumbrian Field Company, Royal Engineers
Sergeant A. E. Faithfull, 28th Divisional Signal Company, Royal Engineers
Acting Regimental Quartermaster-Sergeant G. Farrant, 1st Battalion, Gordon Highlanders
Sergeant C. E. J. Faulkner, 2nd Battalion, Middlesex Regiment
Company Quartermaster-Sergeant J. Fearnehough, 2nd Battalion, South Lancashire Regiment
Acting Corporal E. Felgate, 4th Battalion, Rifle Brigade
Lance-Corporal H. Ferguson, 1st Battalion, Royal Scots Fusiliers
Laiice-Corporal W. Ferrill, 2nd Battalion, King's Royal Rifle Corps
Sapper H. J. Ferris, "O" Cable Section, Royal Engineers
Sergeant J. Finnigan, 2nd Battalion, Welsh Regiment
Lance-Corporal T. Flanagan, 1st Battalion, Shropshire Light Infantry
Private T. Foley, 1st Battalion, Cheshire Regiment
Company Sergeant-Major W. G. Foster, 4th Battalion, Royal Fusiliers
Sergeant (now Warrant Officer, Class II) E. Fox, 2nd Battalion, Yorkshire Regiment
Driver T. Foye, 22nd Brigade Ammunition Column, Royal Field Artillery
Corporal W. N. Frampton, Honourable Artillery Company
Corporal W. Francis, 1st Battalion, South Wales Borderers
Private E. Frazer, 1st Battalion, Worcestershire Regiment
Lance-Corporal S. French, 2nd Home Counties Field Company, Royal Engineers
Sergeant A. G. Fulton, 16th County of London Battalion, London Regiment (Queen's Westminster Rifles) 
Sergeant C. Gambling, 1st Battalion, Dorsetshire Regiment
Private C. Gardner, 2nd Battalion, Scottish Rifles
Company Sergeant-Major G. Garrett, 1st Battalion, Bedfordshire Regiment
Lance-Corporal H. Gascoyne, 1st Battalion, Coldstream Guards
Company Sergeant-Major C. Gates, 2nd Battalion, Suffolk Regiment
Corporal H. W. Gedge, 55th Field Company, Royal Engineers
Sergeant E. H. George, 2nd Battalion, King's Own Yorkshire Light Infantry
Sergeant H. Gibbs, 23rd Battery, Royal Field Artillery
Private J. Gill, 2nd Battalion, Royal Sussex Regiment
Battery Quartermaster-Sergeant W. H. Gillard, 56th Battery, Royal Field Artillery
Sergeant J. J. Glynn, 1st Battalion, Irish Guards
Acting-Sergeant W. Golder, 1st Battalion, Norfolk Regiment
Sergeant D. Gordon, 2nd Battalion, Royal Scots (Lothian Regiment)
Lance-Corporal E. M. Gormley, 1st Battalion, Middlesex Regiment
Lance-Corporal F. Grainge, 3rd Battalion, Coldstream Guards
Sergeant J. Gray, 2nd Battalion, York and Lancaster Regiment
Private W. Gray, 1st Battalion, Dorsetshire Regiment
Sergeant E.G. Green, 1st Battalion, Norfolk Regiment
Company Sergeant-Major L. Green, 1st Battalion, Royal Warwickshire Regiment
Sergeant G. F. Greenhill, 4th Battalion, Royal Fusiliers
Company Sergeant-Major F. Greenwood, 1st Battalion, Royal Fusiliers
Company Sergeant-Major C. Gregory, 2nd Battalion, Lancashire Fusiliers
Company Quartermaster-Sergeant A. J. Griflin, 23rd Field Company, Royal Engineers
Private R. Griffiths, 4th Battalion, Rifle Brigade
Sergeant P. Griggs, 1st Battalion, East Surrey Regiment
Acting Company Sergeant-Major E. Grimes, Royal Garrison Artillery (4th Division)
Private F. Grimwood, 1st Battalion, East Surrey Regiment
Company Sergeant-Major T. Groggins, 2nd Battalion, Border Regiment
Corporal J. E. Hager, 11th Battery, Royal Field Artillery
Private A. Hainge, 1st Battalion, Royal Berkshire Regiment
Sergeant W. Hales, 15th Field Company, Royal Engineers
Sergeant T. Harding, 1st Battalion, Gloucestershire Regiment
Acting Corporal W. H. Harding, 1st Battalion, East Surrey Regiment
1st Class Air Mechanic W. Harper, Royal Flying Corps
Sergeant W. H. Harris, 2nd Battalion, Royal Warwickshire Regiment
Sergeant F. Harrison, 2nd Battalion, Manchester Regiment
Lance-Corporal D. Hart, 1st Battalion, Cameron Highlanders
Acting Company Sergeant-Major A. Hawkins, 1st Battalion, Bedfordshire Regiment
Bandsman J. Hay, 2nd Battalion, Seaforth Highlanders
Acting Sergeant W. J. Hayden, 1st Battalion, Hampshire Regiment
Private J. Hayes, 3rd Battalion, Worcestershire Regiment (transferred to Royal Engineers)
Sergeant C. F. Hayman, 1st Battalion, Coldstream Guards
Flight Sergeant W. C. Hayward, Royal Flying Corps
Lance-Corporal W. Hazell, 1st London Field Company, Royal Engineers
Private W. Hemmings, 2nd Battalion, Monmouthshire Regiment
Piper A. Henderson, 1st Battalion, Cameron Highlanders
Corporal T. Henson, 1st Battalion, North.amptonshire Regiment
Private W. Herd, Royal Army Medical Corps (attached 8th Battalion, Royal Scots)
Private J. High, 1st Battalion, Norfolk Regiment
Private A. S. Highstone, 2nd Canadian Battalion
Corporal J. B. Hill, 16th County of London Battalion, London Regiment (Queen's Westminster Rifles)
Private M. Hill, Honourable Artillery Company
Private R. Hill, 1/6th Battalion, North Staffordshire Regiment
Sergeant W. G. Hoar, 65th Battery, Royal Field Artillery
Lance-Corporal W. Hodgson, 2nd Battalion, Border Regiment
Acting Sergeant J. H. Hogg, 1st Battalion, Royal Scots (Lothian Regiment)
Private W. Hoggarth, 3rd Battalion, Coldstream Guards
Driver A. J. Hook, British Red Cross Society (No. 4 Motor Ambulance Convoy)
Company-Sergeant-Major C. Hopkins, 2nd Battalion, Gloucestershire Regiment
Private J. Homer, 2nd Battalion, Yorkshire Regiment
Sergeant W. Homer, 2nd Battalion, West Yorkshire Regiment
Private A. Hotz, 1st Battalion, East Surrey Regiment
Sergeant C. T. Howarth, 2nd Battalion, Nottinghamshire and Derbyshire Regiment
Sergeant Piper J. S. Howarth, 6th (Banff and Donside) Battalion, Gordon Highlanders
Private W. W. Howarth, 10th (Scottish) Battalion, Liverpool Regiment
Private A. W. Howitt, Royal Army Medical Corps
Corporal W. Huddart, 2nd Battalion, York and Lancaster Regiment
Acting Colour-Sergeant T. Hudson, 2nd Battalion, Oxfordshire and Buckinghamshire Light Infantry
Flight-Sergeant T. Hughes, Royal Flying Corps
Acting Corporal T. Hughes, 2nd Battalion, Royal Welsh Fusiliers
Gunner T. Humphrey, O Battery, Royal Horse Artillery
Private F. N. Hunt, 2nd Battalion, Royal Welsh Fusiliers
Acting Corporal J. Hunt, 2nd Battalion, South Staffordshire Regiment
Private D. Hyles, 1st Battalion, King's Royal Rifle Corps
Sergeant C. Ingram, 84th (2nd London) Field Ambulance, Royal Army Medical Corps
Lance-Corporal J. J. Ingram, 3rd Battalion, Coldstream Guards
Sergeant P. Ives, 3rd Canadian Battalion
Sergeant G. W. Jackson, 1st Battalion, Coldstream Guards
Bombardier H. James, 32nd Battery, Royal Field Artillery
Lance-Corporal E. G. James, 1st Battalion, Royal Welsh Fusiliers
Corporal H. Jameson, Royal Flying Corps
Sergeant J. Jardine, 1st/1st Lowland Field Company, Royal Engineers
Sergeant W. J. Jeffrey, 3rd Battalion, Loyal North Lancashire Regiment (attached 1st Battalion)
Company-Sergeant-Major J. H. Johnson, 2nd Battalion, Lincolnshire Regiment
Corporal J. Johnstone, 1st Battalion, Shropshire, Light Infantry
Acting Corporal D. T. Jones, Honourable Artillery Company
Bombardier A. H. Jordan, 35th Heavy Battery, Royal Garrison Artillery
Private R. W. Joslyn, 5th Canadian Battalion
Sapper T. Judd, 5th Signal Company, Royal Engineers
Private A. W. Kaye, 4th Canadian Battalion
Private R. D. Keenan, 1st Battalion, Royal Irish Fusiliers
Sapper F. T. Keevill, 5th Signal Company, Royal Engineers
Bandsman W. Kelly, 1st Battalion, Northumberland Fusiliers
Corporal B. E. Kennedy, Canadian Signal Company
Sergeant B. Kent, 2nd Battalion, West Riding Regiment
Private T. Killen, 1st Battalion, Somerset Light Infantry
Corporal W. J. Kimber, 2nd Battalion, Royal West Surrey Regiment
Acting Bombardier J. D. King, 27th Brigade, Royal Field Artillery
Acting Corporal T. C. King, 1st Battalion, Dorsetshire Regiment
Sergeant W. Kirk, 1st Battalion, Lincolnshire Regiment
Private J. Lambie, 1st Battalion, Argyll and Sutherland Highlanders
Private L. Landon, 1/5th Battalion, North Staffordshire Regiment
Private E. Langford, 1/6th Battalion, South Staffordshire Regiment
Sergeant A. Leach, 2nd Battalion, Devonshire Regiment (attached 8th Signal Company)
Lance-Sergeant W. Ledsham, 4th (Denbighshire) Battalion, Royal Welsh Fusiliers
Acting Sergeant S. J. Lee, 1st Battalion, Hampshire Regiment
Acting Bombardier E. E. Leicester, 11th Battery, Royal Field Artillery
Company Sergeant-Major F. Lelliot, 1st Battalion, Royal Lancaster Regiment
Company Sergeant-Major J. Lemon, 2nd Battalion, Manchester Regiment
Acting Sergeant H. M. Lever, 2nd Battalion, Royal Scots (Lothian Regiment)
Lance-Corporal R. Lewis, 1st Battalion, South Wales Borderers
Acting Corporal D. Liddle, 2nd Battalion, Cameron Highlanders
Sergeant H. Liddle, 2nd Battalion, Yorkshire Regiment
Sergeant R. Lishman, 4th Battalion, Rifle Brigade
Private J. Little, 1st Battalion, Cameron Highlanders
Drill-Sergeant J. Littler, 2nd Battalion, Grenadier Guards
Sergeant C. H. Llewellin, Air Line Section, Royal Engineers
Gunner A. J. Lock, 1st Brigade, Royal Field Artillery
Lance-Corporal T. Lockwood, 2nd Battalion, King's Own Yorkshire Light Infantfry
Acting Sergeant C. Love, 2nd Battalion, Monmouthshire Regiment
Sergeant N. M. Lowe, lst/14th County of London Battalion, London Regiment (London Scottish)
Lance-Corporal S. Lucy, 1st Battalion, East Kent Regiment
Private E. Luddington, 2nd Battalion, Northamptonshire Regiment (attached 8th Signal Company)
Private R. Ludgate, South Irish Horse
Bombardier F. C. Luke, 37th Battery, Royal Field Alrtillery
Sergeant C. Lurin, 16th Canadian Battalion
Private A. MacArtair, Canadian Signal Company
Sergeant A. W. MacDonald, 1st Battalion, East Lancashire Regiment
Sergeant J. Macdonald, Canadian Divisional Train
Lance-Corporal J. D. Mackenzie, 2nd Battalion, Cameron Highlanders
Private L. Macnamara, 2nd Battalion, Royal Scots Fusiliers
Lance-Sergeant C. C. MacWalteir, 1st Battalion, East Kent Regiment
Private J. R. Mallette, 14th Canadian Battalion
Private W. H. Mander, 1st Battalion, North Staffordshire Regiment
Corporal E. Mann, 1st Battalion, Royal Lancaster Regiment
Sergeant T. Mansell, 5th Signal Company, Royal Engineers
Private A. Mardell, 1st Battalion, Scottish Rifles
Acting Sergeant W. Markham, 1st Battalion, Royal West Kent Regiment
Company Sergeant-Major J. Marnie, 1/5th (Angus and Dundee) Battalion, Royal Highlanders
Sergeant F. W. Marsh, 1st Battalion, Loyal North Lancashire Regiment
Sergeant G. H. Marshall, 9th Field Company, Royal Engineers
Acting Company Quartermaster-Sergeant S. Mart, 2nd Battalion, Bedfordshire Regiment
Corporal A. Martin, 1st Battalion, Scots Guards
Private C. Martin, 7th Battalion, Northumberland Fusiliers
Company Sergeant-Major E. Martin, 2nd Battalion, Lancashire Fusiliers
Bombardier F. J. Martin, 29th Brigade, Royal Field Artillery
Lance-Corporal F. S. Martin, 1st Battalion, East Surrey Regiment
Corporal G. Martin, 2nd Battalion, Durham Light Infantry
Driver R. E. Mason, 4th Reserve Brigade (formerly 146th Battery), Royal Field Artillery
Bombardier H. F. Mayo, 365th Battery, Royal Field Artillery
Company Sergeant A. Mayston, 2nd Battalion, Worcestershire Regiment
Company Sergeant-Major G. McCallum, 2nd Battalion, Cameron Highlanders
Sapper M. McClosky, 56th Company, Royal Engineers
Private P. McCormick, 2nd Battalion, Royal Irish Fusiliers
Sergeant T. McFarland, 2nd Battalion, Royal Inniskilling Fusiliers
Private W. McFarlane, 2nd Battalion, Royal Scots (Lothian Regiment)
Sergeant P. McGowan, 34th Battery, Royal Field Artillery
Sergeant J. McGuire, 1/5th Battalion, Liverpool Regiment
Private T. McGuire, 2nd Canadian Battalion
Private J. Mclnroy, 1st Battalion, Royal Highlanders
Private J. McKenna, 1st Battalion, Royal Irish Fusiliers
Sapper J. McLaren, 57th Company, Royal Engineers
Private J. P. McManus, 2nd Battalion, King's Own Scottish Borderers
Private J. McNeill, 8th Battalion, Royal Scots (Lothian Regiment)
Sergeant V. J. McOmie, 105th Battery, Royal Field Artillery
Sapper S. W. Mepham, 57th Company, Royal Engineers
Sergeant S. H. Middleton, 2nd Battalion, Shropshire Light Infantry
Corporal J. W. Mildenhall, 36th Brigade, Royal Field Artillery
Private C. Miles, 1st Battalion, King's Royal Rifle Corps
Sergeant G. Millington, 40th Battery, Royal Field Artillery
Second Corporal C. H. Milne, 23rd Field Company, Royal Engineers
Private C. W. Mills, 2nd Battalion, Royal West Surrey Regiment
Sergeant E. E. Mills, 15th Field Company, Royal Engineers
Corporal J. Minnery, 2nd Battalion, Argyll and Sutherland Highlanders
Battery Quartermaster-Sergeant G. Mitchell, 32nd Brigade, Royal Field Artillery
Sergeant J. Moffat, 9th (Glasgow Highland) Battalion, Highland Light Infantry
Sergeant F. T. Montgomery, 1st Battalion, Royal Warwickshire Regiment
Driver J. O. Moran, Army Service Corps
Lance-Sergeant B. Morgan, 5th Battalion, Scottish Rifles
Sergeant J. Morley, 5th Battalion, Loyal North Lancashire Regiment
Private J. Morrison, 8th Battalion, Durham Light Infantry
Private J. Mullins, 1st Battalion, Dorsetshire Regiment
Private T. M. Mullins, 7th Canadian Battalion
Private N. Mumby, 1st Battalion, Lincolnshire Regiment
Lance-Sergeant J. Murphy, 4th Battalion, Middlesex Regiment
Private M. Murphy, 1st Battalion, Leinster Regiment
Sergeant S. Murray, 1st Battalion, Rifle Brigade
Sergeant E. Murrell, 2nd Battalion, Grenadier Guards
Corporal J. Mutimer, 24th Heavy Battery, Royal Garrison Artillery
Lance-Corporal H. Neal, 1st Battalion, Nottinghamshire and Derbyshire Regiment
Private J. Needham, 1st Battalion, Cheshire Regiment
Sergeant G. Neiderauer, 3rd Battalion, Royal Sussex Regiment (attached 2nd Battalion)
Private J. Nelson, 2nd Battalion, Cameron Highlanders
Sergeant F. Newman, Royal Army Medical Corps
1st Class Air Mechanic L. S. Newns, Royal Flying Corps
Corporal J. L. Noble, 2nd Battalion, Shropshire Light Infantry
Private J. O'Connor, 1st Battalion, Irish Guards
Bombardier T. O'Shaughnessey, 2nd Mountain Battery, Royal Garrison Artillery
Lance-Cbrporal M. O'Sullivan, 2nd Battalion, Leinster Regiment
Sergeant D. P. O'Toole, 1st Battalion, South Wales Borderers
Company Sergeant-Major E. Owens, 1st Battalion, Cheshire Regiment
Acting Sergeant W. E. Packhard, 1st Battalion, East Surrey Regiment
Acting Sergeant F. E. Parker, 2nd Battalion, Royal Berkshire Regiment
2nd Corporal F. H. Parker, 7th Field Company, Royal Engineers
Driver S. A. Pate, Canadian Divisional Train
Company Sergeant-Major J. Pattison, 1/5th (Angus and Dundee) Battalion, Royal Highlanders
Corporal E. Paul, 2nd Battalion, Nottinghamshire and Derbyshire Regiment
Acting Corporal J. J. Pavitt, 1st Battalion, Leinsber Regiment
Corporal R. E. P. Paynter, Royal Flying Corps
Sergeant G. Pearce, 4th Battalion, Rifle Brigade
Sergeant H. N. Pearless, 7th Canadian Battalion
Acting Sergeant T. R. Pearson, 1st Battalion, Northamptonshire Regiment
Private C. Penwill, 1st Battalion, Coldstream Guards
Private W. Peverley, 2nd Battalion, Durham Light Infantry
Sergeant E. J. Phillips, 26th Field Company, Royal Engineers
Lance-Corporal C. Phillipson, 2nd Battalion, Northamptonshire Regiment
Company Sergeant-Major A. Phipps, Army Service Corps
Second Corporal W. A. Pirn, 43rd Wessex Divisional Signal Company, Royal Engineers
Private L. Pollitt, 1/5th (Earl of Chester's) Battalion, Cheshire Regiment
Company Sergeant-Major E. G. Port, 2nd Battalion, East Kent Regiment
Sergeant W. F. Pothecary, 5th City of London Battalion, London Regiment (London Rifle Brigade)
Company Sergeant-Major H. Potter, 1st Divisional Cyclist Company, Army Cyclist Corps (late Royal West Surrey Regiment)
Private Jack Auguste Pouchot, 16th County of London Battalion, London Regiment (Queen's Westminster Rifles)
Gunner G. Powley, 26th Heavy Battery, Royal Garrison Artillery
Company Sergeant-Major (now Lieutenant) C. B. Price, 14th Canadian Battalion
Private R. L. Prince, 1st Battalion, Somerset Light Infantry
Sergeant G. Prior, 26th Heavy Battery, Royal Garrison Artillery
Sergeant H. Quantrill, 1st Battalion, Suffolk Regiment
Private H. S. Quigley, 2nd Infantry Brigade, Staff, Canadian Contingent
Gunner J. Rafferty, Motor Machine Gun Service
Sergeant G. H. Rastall, 1st Battalion, Royal Lancaster Regiment
Private J. Rawlinson, 1st Battalion, Royal Lancaster Regiment
Sergeant F. Rayment, 1st Battalion, Hertfordshire Regiment
Gunner J. E. Reece, 33rd Brigade, Royal Field Artillery
Sergeant H. Rees, 1st Battalion, Royal Irish Rifles
Lance-Corporal L. H. Reeve, 1st Battalion, King's Royal Rifle Corps
Bandsman G. P. W. Regan, 2nd Battalion, Leinster Regiment
Acting Corporal J. Reid, 1st Battalion, Cameron Highlanders
Lance-Corporal J. Rendall, 2nd Battalion, Welsh Regiment (attached 170th Company Royal Engineers)
Corporal E. G. Revell, 2nd Signal Company, Royal Engineers 
Corporal S. G. Rickard,C Air Line Section, Royal Engineers
Private F. Riddlestone, lit Battalion, Suffolk Regiment
Sergeant-Major D. A. Rigby, 5th Battalion, Scottish Rifles
Company Sergeant-Major F. Robb, 1st Battalion, Argyll and Sutherland Highlanders
Lance-Corporal- A. C. G. Roberts, 2nd Battalion, Middlesex Regiment
Gunner A. J. Roberts, 1st Siege Battery, Royal Garrison Artillery
Private J. Roberts, 5th Battalion, South Lancashire Regiment
Sergeant H. R. Robertson, 1/5th Battalion, Liverpool Regiment
Lance-Corporal R. Robertson, 2nd Battalion, Highland Light Infantry
Corporal E. D. J. Rogers, 5th Field Company, Royal Engineers
Corporal T. O. Ross, 10th Canadian Battalion
Corporal W. J. Rouse, 12th Field Company, Royal Engineers
Lance-Corporal W. F. Rumfitt, 2nd Battalion, Cameron Highlanders
Sergeant H. Russell, 7th Field Company, Royal Engineers
Lance-Sergeant P. Rutherford, 1st Battalion, Royal Highlanders
Private E. Salisbury, 2nd Battalion, Royal Welsh Fusiliers
Acting Sergeant. Sawyer, 2nd Battalion, West Yorkshire Regiment
Company Sergeant-Major M. Sayers, 1st Battalion, East Lancashire Regiment
Corporal J. Scales, 30th Brigade, Royal Field Artillery
Sergeant E. R. C. Scholefield (now Second Lieutenant in Special Reserve of Officers), Royal Flying Corps
Corporal S. Schultz, 10th Canadian Battalion
Company Sergeant-Major T. H. Scott, 2nd Battalion, Welsh Regiment
Company Sergeant-Major A. Scrase, 1st Battalion, Rifle Brigade
Acting Corporal A. W. Sear, 1st Battalion, Royal Berkshire Regiment
Private J. H. Searle, 1st Battalion, Devonshire Regiment
Sergeant E. Selby, 1st Battalion, Hertfordshire Regiment
Corporal J. A. Selwood, 1/4th (City of Bristol) Battalion, Gloucestershire Regiment
Private J. E. Shalliker, 2nd Battalion, Manchester Regiment
Corporal J. Shanks, 9th (Dumbartonshire) Battalion, Argyll and Sutherland Highlanders
Company Sergeant-Major (now Second Lieutenant) W. Sheay, 2nd Battalion, Yorkshire Regiment
Private B. R. Sheil, 1/8th Battalion, Royal Warwickshire Regiment
Lance-Corporal J. Sinclair, 1st Battalion, Argyll and Sutherland Highlanders
Corporal S. P. Skinner, 56th Company, Royal Engineers
Company Sergeant-Major T. F. Slim, 3rd Battalion, Worcestershire Regiment
Sergeant J. Slorance, 1st Battalion, Royal Highlanders
Private C. F. Smith, 1st Battalion, Lincolnshire Regiment
Corporal E. Smith, 1st Battalion, King's Own Yorkshire Light Infantry
Sapper G. Smith, 15th Field Company, Royal Engineers
Acting Corporal H. Smith, 6th Battalion, Northumberland Fusiliers
Private H. Smith, 2nd Battalion, Royal West Surrey Regiment
Battery Sergeant-Major J. Smith, 43rd Battery, Royal Field Artillery
Private J. Smith. 2nd Battalion. Gordon Highlanders
Private J. W. Smith, 1st Battalion, East Yorkshire Regiment
Sergeant V. R. Smith, 2nd Battalion, East Kent Regiment
Sergeant W. Smith, 1st Battalion, Gloucestershire Regiment. R
Lance-Corporal T. H. Spanton, 3rd Battalion, King's Royal Rifle Corps
Bombardier A. Spence, Royal Field Artillery
Lance-Corporal J. Stead, 2nd Battalion, Scots Guards
Lance-Corporal R. Stead, 1st Battalion, West Yorkshire Regiment
Lance-Corporal A. E. Stevens, 2nd Battalion, Gloucestershire Regiment
Lance-Corporal D. A. Stewart, 1st/14th County of London Battalion, London Regiment (London Scottish)
Company Sergeant-Major J. J. .Stewart, 2nd Battalion, King's Own Scottish Borderers
Acting Sergeant R. Stewart, 2nd Battalion, Gordon Highlanders
Drummer A. J. Stiffin, Honourable Artillery Company
Private A. P. Stokes, 5th Battalion, Northumberland Fusiliers
Private A. Storer, 1/6th. Battalion, North Staffordshire Regiment
Corporal J. S. Stott, 1st/14th County of London Battalion, London Regiment (London Scottish)
Lance-Corporal T. H. Stranson, 5th City of London Battalion, London Regiment (London Rifle Brigade)
Private C. J. Sturch, 2nd Battalion, Rifle Brigade
Regimental Sergeant-Major A. Sutherland, 1st Battalion, Seaforth Highlanders
Sergeant W. Swain, 2nd Field Company, Royal Engineers
Acting Company Sergeant-Major E. Tabb, 1st Battalion, Devonshire Regiment
Lance-Corporal W. G. Tanner, 2nd Battalion, Argyll and Sutherland Highlanders
Gunner R. Taylor, 104th Battery, Royal Field Artillery
Sergeant W. Tector, let Battalion, Leinster Regiment
Sergeant A. Thompson, 1st Battalion, Northumberland Fusiliers
Private F. Thompson, 1st Battalion, Cheshire Regiment
Acting Corporal J. Thompson, 2nd Battalion, King's Own Scottish Borderers
Private T. Thorburn, 2nd Battalion, Argyll and Sutherland Highlanders
Corporal G. Tibbets, 2nd Battalion, Worcestershire Regiment
Company Sergeant-Major J. P. Tighe, 1st Battalion, Royal Irish Regiment
Flight-Sergeant T. G. Tindale, Royal Flying Corps
Private W. J. Tookey, 1st Battalion, King's Own Yorkshire Light Infantry
Sergeant H. Trasler, 1st Battalion, Bedfordshire Regiment
Acting Company Quartermaster-Sergeant G. F. Turl, 2nd Battalion, Essex Regiment
Private J. Turnbull, 9th (Dumbartonshire) Battalion, Argyll and Sutherland Highlanders
Private F. Turner, Canadian Army Medical Corps
Sergeant C. Utting, 2nd Field Company, Royal Engineers
Corporal A. S. Vallis, 2nd Battalion, Royal Scots Fusiliers
Sergeant H. Venn, 2nd Battalion, Royal Berkshire Regiment
Corporal B. Venters, 364th Battery, Royal Field Artillery
Sergeant H. J. V. Voisey, Royal Army Medical Corps
Private O. Waghorn, 5th (Cinque Ports) Battalion, Royal Sussex Regiment
Lance-Corporal F. B. Wakelin, 1st Canadian Battalion
Acting Corporal T. Wallace, 1st Battalion, Royal Soots (Lothian Regiment)
Private H. Walters, 8th Canadian Battalion
Acting Sergeant E. Ward, 1st Battalion, Royal Berkshire Regiment
Lance-Corporal C. Warner, 1st Battalion, Nottinghamshire and Derbyshire Regiment
Corporal A. Watson, 72nd Battery, Royal Field Artillery
Lance-Corporal H. Watson, 2nd Battalion, East Lancashire Regiment
Private W. R. Watt, 6th (Banff and Donside) Battalion, Gordon Highlanders
Lance-Corporal H. Watts, 1st Battalion, Royal Lancaster Regiment
Company Sergeant-Major H. Webb, 1st Battalion, Worcestershire Regiment
Company Sergeant-Major W. Webb, 2nd Battalion, Suffolk Regiment
Sergeant W. J. Webb, 119th Heavy Battery, Royal Garrison Artillery
Sergeant J. Webster, 1/5th (Angus and Dundee) Battalion, Royal Highlanders
Company Sergeant-Major W. Weeks, 1st Battalion, Welsh Regiment
Sergeant J. Wells, 2nd Battalion, Worcestershire Regiment
Private A. J. West, 1st Battalion, Middlesex Regiment
Company Sergeant-Major W. F. Westcott, 2nd Battalion, West Yorkshire Regiment
Private A. T. Weston, 1/6th Battalion, North Staffordshire Regiment
Lance-Corporal H. P. Wheeldon, 1/8th Battalion, Royal Warwickshire Regiment
Private G. A. White, 5th Canadian Battalion
Bombardier J. G. E. P. Whiting, 8th Brigade, Royal Field Artillery
Lance-Corporal W. G. Whiting, 2nd Battalion, Yorkshire Regiment
Lance-Corporal W. Whitla, 1st Canadian Battalion
Corporal J. J. Wibberly, 55th Field Company, Royal Engineers
Acting Sergeant H. Wicks, 1st Battalion, Leinster Regiment
Company Quartermaster-Sergeant F. Widdowson, 1st Battalion, Nottinghamshire and Derbyshire Regiment
Corporal T. Wilkie, 2nd Battalion, Coldstream Guards
Private R. Wilkinson, 1st Battalion, King's Royal Rifle Corps
Acting Lance-Corporal G. Williams, 1st Battalion, Lincolnshire Regiment
Acting Corporal J. Williams, 2nd Battalion, Royal Welsh Fusiliers
Private W. Williams, 2nd Battalion, Scottish Rifles
Private R. Wilson, 1st Battalion, Royal Highlanders
Private T. Wilson, 1st Battalion, Royal Scots (Lothian Regiment)
Corporal W. Wilson, 1st Battalion, Leicestershire Regiment
Acting Corporal A. Windebank, 2nd City of London Battalion, London Regiment (Royal Fusiliers)
Company Sergeant-Major C. Withers, 1st Battalion, South Staffordshire Regiment
Corporal J. Wood, 9th Field Company, Royal Engineers
Sergeant J. E. Wood, 1st Battalion, East Yorkshire Regiment
Corporal R. J. Wood, 1st Wessex Field Ambulance, Royal Army Medical Corps
Private W. G. Woodroff, 1st Battalion, Wiltshire Regiment
Company Sergeant-Major A. Worsley, 1st Battalion, Royal Lancaster Regiment
Driver H. Wray, 366th Battery, Royal Field Artillery
Acting Sergeant D. Wright, 1st Battalion, Royal West Kent Regiment
Company Sergeant-Major H. Wright, 3rd Battalion, Middlesex Regiment
Sergeant W. E. Wyatt, 57th Company, Royal Engineers
Serjeant J. Yearsley, 1st Battalion, Argyll and Sutherland Highlanders
Lance-Corporal S. Yorke, 2nd Battalion, South Lancashire Regiment
Sapper C. Young, 2nd Field Company, Royal Engineers
Lance-Sergeant H. Young, 2nd Battalion, King's Royal Rifle Corps
Lance-Sergeant J. Young, 1st Battalion, Royal West Kent Regiment
Sergeant W. Young, 2nd Battalion, Scots Guards
Private J. Yourston, 7th Battalion, Northumberland Fusiliers

Indian Order of Merit (IOM)
"His Majesty the KING-EMPEROR has been graciously pleased to approve of the undermentioned Rewards to Officers, Non-Commissioned Officers and Men of the Indian Army for gallantry and devotion to duty whilst serving with the Indian Army Corps, British Expeditionary Force:"

2nd Class
Sapper Jiwa Khan (No. 3 Company), 1st King George's Own Sappers and Miners
Havildar Bishii Singh, 15th Ludhiana Sikhs
Sepoy Bakshi Singh, 15th Ludhiana Sikhs
Sepoy Bhagwan Singh, 36th Sikhs (attached 47th Sikhs)
Jemadar Lehna Singh, 40th Pathans
Jemadar Mangal Singh., 57th Wilde's Rifles (Frontier Force)
Naik Atma Singh, 57th Wilde's Rifles (Frontier Force)
Sepoy Raji Khan, 129th Duke of Connaught's Own Baluchis
Rifleman Bhaudoj Rai, 1st Battalion, 4th Gurkha Rifles
Havildar Bhakat Singh Raua, 2nd Battalion, 4th Gurkha Rifles (attached 1/1st Battalion)
Rifleman Tika Ram Kunwar, 1st Battalion, 3rd Gurkha, Rifles

Indian Distinguished Service Medal (IDSM) 
Jemadar Nur Alam, 3rd Sappers and Miners (20th Company)
Driver Havildar Mahamed Baksh, 3rd Sappers and Miners (21st Company)
Sapper Indar Singh, 3rd Sappers and Miners (20th Company)
2nd Class Senior Sub-Assistant Surgeon Mahadeo-Pershad, Indian Subordinate Medical Department (attached II 1st Gurkha Rifles). 
1st Class Sub-Assistant Surgeon Narayan-Parshad Sukul, Indian Subordinate Medical Department (112th Field Ambulance)
Lance Naik Mangli, Army Bearer Corps, 8 Company, 113th Field Ambulance.

Royal Red Cross (RRC) 
Queen Alexandra's Imperial Military Nursing Service
F. M. Hodgins
H. W. Reid
G. M. Richards
A. F. Byers 
J. H. Congleton
M. C. Corbishley 
H. Hartigan
C. MacK. MacRae
K. M. Mathews
G. M. Smith

Queen Alexandra's Imperial Military Nursing Service (Reserve)
N. Adler
E. G. Barrett
E. M. Hansard
C. Elston
J. Barclay Smith
L. M. Thurling

Queen Alexandra's Military Nursing Service for India
E. F. Watt

Territorial Force Nursing Service
H. G. Palin
A. H. Ivin
E. A. Jackson
P. M. Morris
C. Webber

Civil Hospitals Reserve
I. E. M. Barbier, Royal Infirmary, Bristol
S. C. Mclntosh, Royal Infirmary, Edinburgh
M. Clark, Royal Southern Hospital, Liverpool
M. A. Doherty, Dr. Steven's Hospital, Dublin
E. T. Ferguson, Royal Infirmary, Perth
F. Harley, St. Thomas's Hospital, London
K. Johnston, City of Dublin Hospital, Dublin
V. M. Kiddle, Guy's Hospital, London
E. M. Le Sueur, University College Hospital, London
M. Oakey, General Hospital, Birmingham
L. O. Peet, Derby Royal Infirmary, Derby
A. Wainwright, London Hospital, London

British Red Cross Society
N. Fletcher

Australian Nursing Service
I. Greaves

Canadian Nursing Service
E. Campbell

References

Birthday Honours
1915 awards
1915 in Australia
1915 in Canada
1915 in India
1915 in New Zealand
1915 in the United Kingdom